= List of agrarian parties =

This is a list of agrarian parties, that is, parties which explicitly rely on farmers as their main constituency and/or adhere to some form of agrarianism.

For a list of parties called Agrarian Party, Farmers' Party or Peasants' Party see Agrarian Party (disambiguation), Farmers' Party (disambiguation) and Peasants' Party (disambiguation), respectively. For a list of Nordic Agrarian parties see Nordic agrarian parties.

== Active parties ==
=== Americas ===
- United States: Minnesota Democratic–Farmer–Labor Party

=== Europe ===
- Åland: Centre
- Albania: Agrarian Party, Environmentalist Agrarian Party
- Bosnia and Herzegovina: Croatian Peasant Party of Bosnia and Herzegovina
- Bulgaria: People's Union, Agrarian National Union, Agrarian Union "Aleksandar Stamboliyski", Bulgarian Agrarian People's Union–United
- Croatia: Peasant Party, Democratic Peasants' Party
- Czech Republic: Agrarian Democratic Party
- Denmark: Venstre – Liberal Party
- Faroe Islands: Union Party
- Estonia: Estonian Agrarian Centre Party, People's Union
- Finland: Centre Party, Finns Party (in government)
- France: National Centre of Independents and Peasants, Rurality Movement
- Greece: Agricultural Livestock Party of Greece
- Greenland: Atassut
- Hungary: Independent Smallholders, Agrarian Workers and Civic Party
- Iceland: Progressive Party, Centre Party
- Ireland: Farmers' Alliance
- Italy: South Tyrolean People's Party
- Latvia: Farmers' Union (in government)
- Lithuania: Lithuanian Centre Party, Farmers and Greens Union (in government)
- Moldova: Agrarian Party
- Montenegro: Popular Movement
- Netherlands: Farmer–Citizen Movement
- North Macedonia: Party for a European Future
- Norway: Centre Party
- Poland: People's Party, Self-Defense, AGROunia, Piast Faction
- Portugal: People's Monarchist Party
- Romania: Christian Democratic National Peasants' Party, Democratic Union of Hungarians in Romania
- Serbia: United Peasant Party and People's Peasant Party
- Slovakia: Party of the Hungarian Coalition
- Slovenia: People's Party
- Spain: Empty Spain
- Sweden: Centre Party
- Switzerland: Swiss People's Party
- Ukraine: People's Party, Agrarian Party, Radical Party
- United Kingdom: Wessex Regionalists

=== Asia ===
- Indonesia: Village Awakening Movement Party
- Kazakhstan: Agrarian Party
- Philippines: Butil Farmers Party
- Sri Lanka: Ceylon Workers' Congress
- Taiwan: Peasant Party

=== Africa ===
- Tunisia: Farmers' Voice Party

=== Oceania ===
- Australia: Katter's Australian Party, National Party, Shooters, Fishers and Farmers Party

== Former parties ==
=== Americas ===
- Argentina: National Autonomist Party
- Canada: United Farmers (specifically: United Farmers of Alberta, United Farmers of Ontario), Progressive Party (specifically: Progressive Party of Manitoba), Co-operative Commonwealth Federation
- Chile: Agrarian Labor Party
- Costa Rica: Agrarian Labour Action Party
- Peru: Agrarian National Party
- United States: Democratic-Republican Party, Greenback Party, Populist Party, Farmer–Labor Party (specifically: Minnesota Farmer–Labor Party)

=== Europe ===
- Belarus: Belarusian Agrarian Party
- Czechoslovakia: Republican Party of Farmers and Peasants
- Denmark: Farmers' Party (Denmark)
- Finland: Finnish Rural Party
- Germany: Agricultural League, Bavarian Peasants' League, Christian-National Peasants' and Farmers' Party, German Farmers' Party, Schleswig-Holstein Farmers and Farmworkers Democracy
  - East Germany: Democratic Farmers' Party of Germany
- Greece: Agrarian Party of Greece, Peasants and Workers Party
- Hungary: Alliance for the Village and Countryside, Agrárszövetség – Nemzeti Agrár Párt
- Ireland: Land League, Farmers' Party, Clann na Talmhan
- Italy: Peasants' Party of Italy
- Liechtenstein: Workers' and Peasants' Party
- Lithuania: Liberal and Centre Union
- Moldova: Bessarabian Peasants' Party
- Netherlands: Farmers' Party, Peasants' League
- Romania: Peasants' Party, National Peasants' Party, Agrarian Democratic Party, National Agrarian Party
- Poland: Polish People's Party "Piast", Polish Peasant Bloc, Polish People's Party "Wyzwolenie", Peasant Party
- Russia: Agrarian Party
- Serbia: Peasants Party of Serbia
- Spain: Agrarian Party
- Turkey: True Path Party
- United Kingdom: Agricultural Party
  - Scotland: Crofters Party
  - Northern Ireland: Unbought Tenants' Association
- Ukraine: People's Bloc, Peasant Democratic Party
- Yugoslavia: Agrarian Party

=== Asia ===
- Indonesia: Village People's Union

=== Oceania ===
- New Zealand: Country Party

== See also ==
- Nordic agrarian parties
- Krestintern
- International Agrarian Bureau
