= Agrarian =

Agrarian means pertaining to agriculture, farmland, or rural areas.

Agrarian may refer to:

== Political philosophy ==
- Agrarianism
- Agrarian law, Roman laws regulating the division of the public lands
- Agrarian reform
- Agrarian socialism

== Society ==
- Agrarian society
- Agrarian structure
- Agrarian system

== See also ==
- Agrarian League (disambiguation)
- Agrarian Party (disambiguation)
- Agrarian Justice, 1797 pamphlet by Thomas Paine
- Southern Agrarians
- Agricultural economics
- Agrarian change
