= 1953 Liechtenstein general election =

1953 Liechtenstein general election may refer to:

- February 1953 Liechtenstein general election
- June 1953 Liechtenstein general election
