= Agrarian revolution =

Agrarian revolution, rebellion, or revolt may refer to either:

- List of peasant revolts against various states
- Agricultural revolution (disambiguation)

== See also ==
- Agronomic revolution
- Green Revolution (disambiguation)
- Revolution (disambiguation)
- Agrarian (disambiguation)
- Agrarian change
