= Old-age and survivors insurance in Liechtenstein =

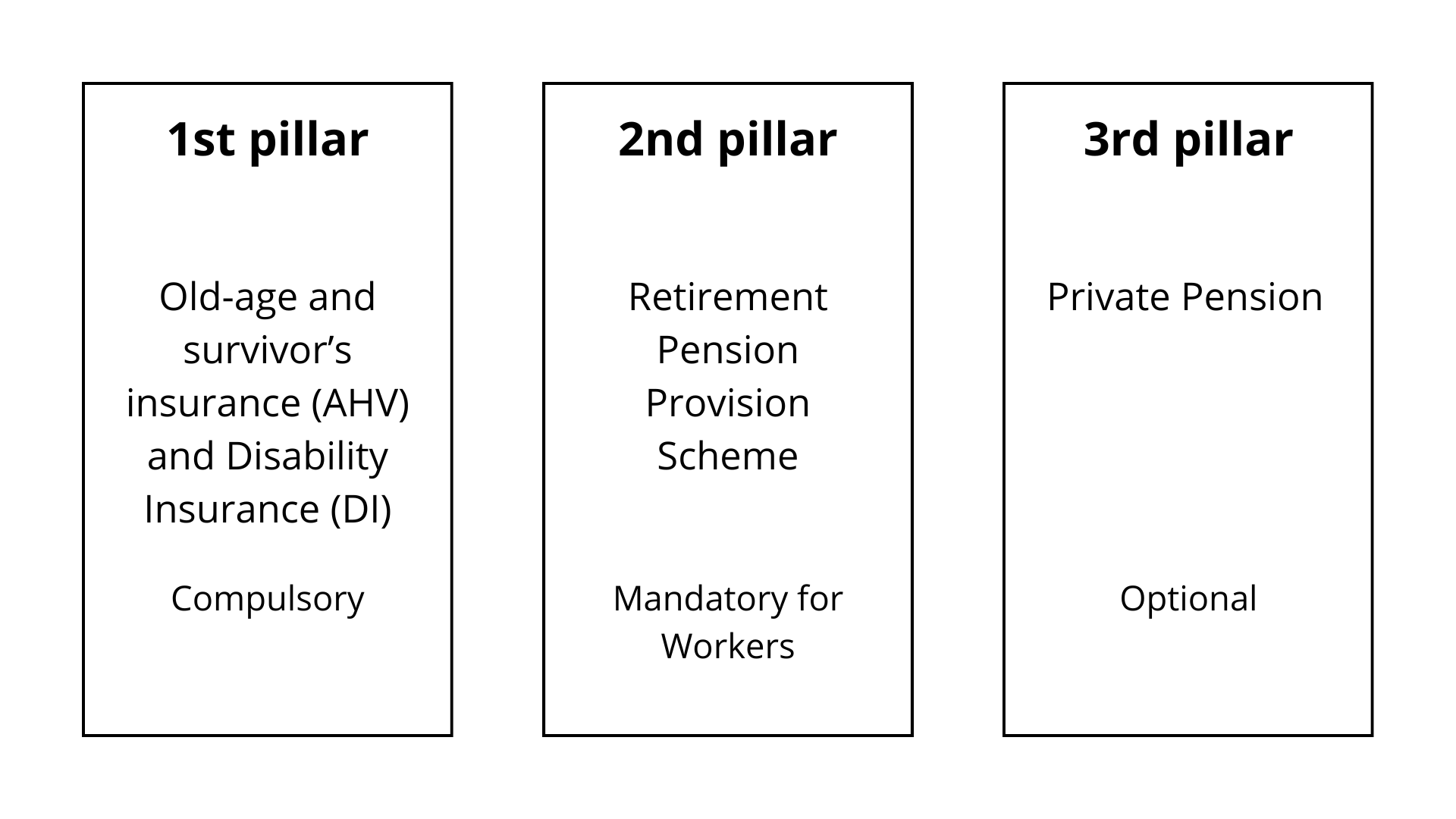
The three pillars of the Swiss pension system, which Liechtenstein also uses:1. State pension: old-age and survivors insurance (AHV) and disability insurance (DI) 2. Occupational pension (pension funds) 3. Private pension (banks).

Old-age and survivors insurance (German: Alters- und Hinterlassenenversicherung, AHV-IV-FAK or AHV for short) is a mandatory insurance scheme in Liechtenstein that provides financial assistance to retirees and dependents of an individual in the event of their death.

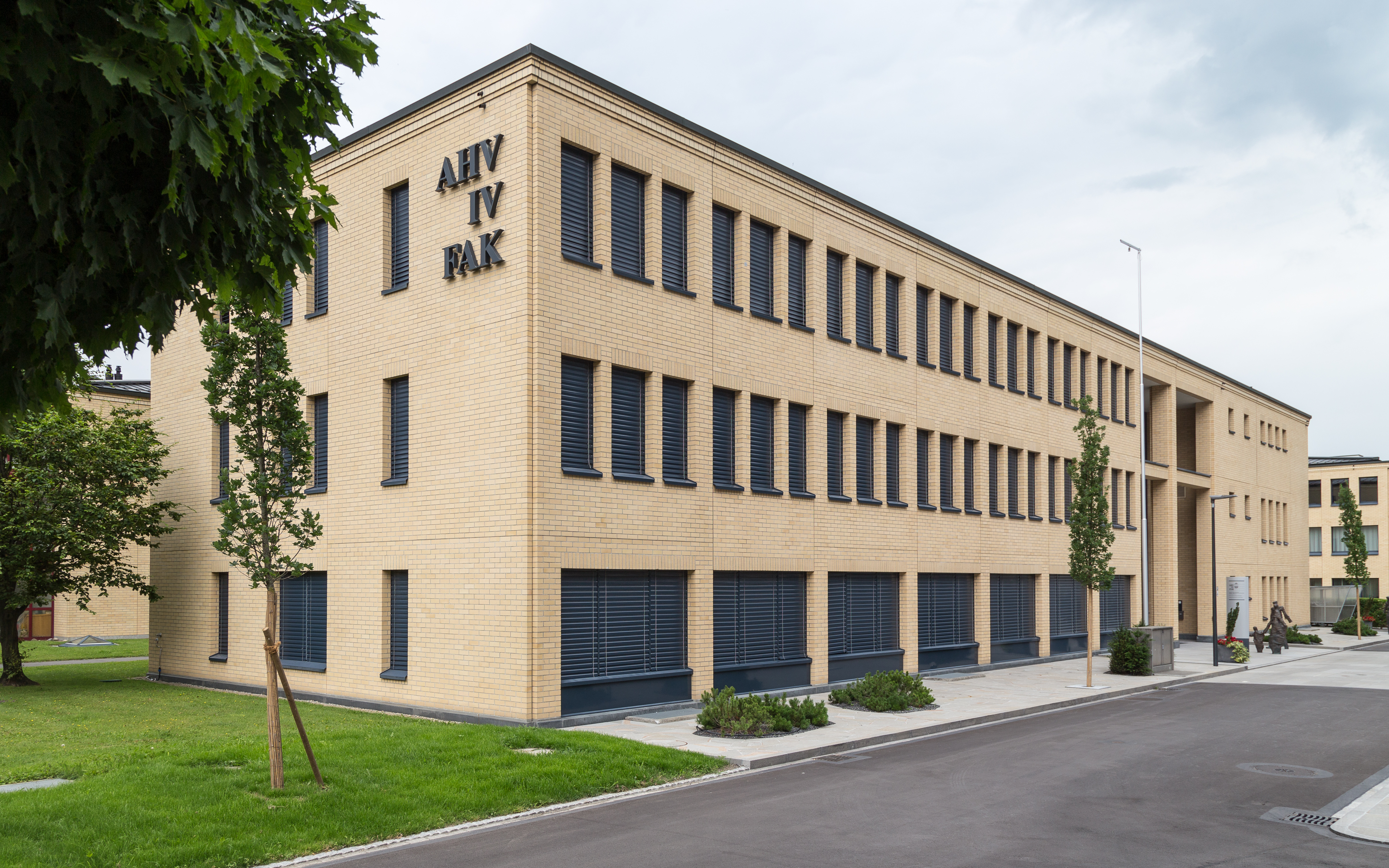
Social insurance building ‘AHV IV FAK’ in Vaduz

The AHV was accepted by a referendum in December 1952 and established in 1954. It is largely based on the Swiss AHV, it follows the three pillars of the Swiss pension system, with the Liechtenstein AHV at the first. As of 2026, the director of the AHV is Thomas Hasler.

== History ==
The Constitution of Liechtenstein, adopted in 1921, gave support for the establishment of social insurance in the country. Though subsequent efforts to create a old-age insurance failed in 1922 and 1938 respectively, a state fund for illness, old age, and disability was established in 1923.

Upon the establishment of the Swiss AHV in 1948, efforts were re-renewed in Liechtenstein. The government of Liechtenstein commissioned a bill in 1949 and it was unanimously approved by the Landtag of Liechtenstein in November 1952. The establishment of the AHV was narrowly approved by a referendum in December. The introduction was supported by Liechtenstein's two political parties — the Progressive Citizens' Party (FBP) and Patriotic Union (VU) — in addition to the Liechtenstein Workers' Association. The introduction faced resistance from farmers and tradespeople. Upon the establishment of the office, the VU demanded a majority of the seven-member administrative composition, including its presidency, to which the FBP refused. In response, the VU members of the newly-elected Landtag walked out in protest, triggering a fresh elections in June 1953. Due to the VU receiving its highest vote share to that point in the fresh elections, the FBP conceded to the VU's demands, and the AHV was formally established on 1 January 1954.

Liechtenstein adopted the three pillars of the Swiss pension system in the mid-1960s, with the AHV as the first. Coinciding with Swiss reforms, Liechtenstein doubled pensions between 1973 and 1975. In 1992, a "Christmas bonus" was introduced that provided an extra 25% to pension payments in the month of December, being increased to 100% by 1995. Further reforms were conducted in 1997, which introduced income (pension) splitting, thus each person receives their own pension regardless of marital status. In addition, the pension limit for married couples was abolished, and the retirement age between men and women was matched at 64.

== Contribution and services ==
All citizens of Liechtenstein as members of the AHV, and contribute through a pay-as-you-go system. The AHV provides old age pensions, widow's and widower's pensions. The retirement age for both men and women is 64. Since 2001, it is possible for an individual to pursue an early retirement from age 60 by receiving early pension payments from the AHV in exchange for a reduced rate. This can also be used to allow for a gradual retirement.

== Bibliography ==
- Vogt, Paul (1987). 125 Jahre Landtag [125 Years of the State Parliament] (in German). Vaduz: Landtag of the Principality of Liechtenstein.
- Brunhart, Arthur (1986). 50 Jahre für Liechtenstein [50 Years for Liechtenstein] (in German). Vaduz: Vaterländische Union – via Liechtenstein State Library.
