= February 1953 Liechtenstein general election =

- 15 February 1953
- All 15 seats in the Landtag; 8 seats needed for a majority
- Turnout: 90.52% (▼1.78pp)
Party	Leader	Vote %	Seats	+/–
FBP	Alexander Frick	50.54	8	0
VU	Otto Schaedler	42.60	7	0
This lists parties that won seats. See the complete results below.
Results by constituency
Prime Minister before	Prime Minister after
Alexander Frick; FBP	Alexander Frick; FBP

General elections were held in Liechtenstein on 15 February 1953 to elect the 15 members of the Landtag. The Progressive Citizens' Party (FBP) won eight seats and retained its majority, while the Patriotic Union (VU) won seven. Voter turnout was 90.5%.

The election saw a new electoral group, the List of Workers and Small Farmers (UEK), contest the election for the only time, but it failed to reach the 18% electoral threshold to win seats in the Landtag. Following the election, the coalition government led by prime minister Alexander Frick remained. Due to a dispute between the FBP and VU regarding the administrative composition of the old age and survivors' insurance (AHV) office in Liechtenstein, the Landtag was dissolved and fresh elections were held in June.

== Background ==
In the 1949 elections, the Progressive Citizens' Party (FBP) retained its majority of eight seats, while the Patriotic Union (VU) won seven. The coalition government under the leadership of prime minister Alexander Frick remained.

Frick's second term oversaw continued steps towards reforming Liechtenstein into a modern welfare state. Notably, in 1952 the old age and survivors' insurance (AHV) office in Liechtenstein, a mandatory life insurance scheme, was established after a successful referendum despite opposition from peasant workers. It also saw Liechtenstein achieve greater international participation, with the country joining the International Court of Justice and signing the Geneva Conventions, both in 1950.

== Electoral system ==
The 15 members of the Landtag were elected by open list proportional representation from two constituencies, Oberland with 9 seats and Unterland with 6 seats. Voters voted for a party list and then may have struck through candidates for whom they did not wish to cast a preferential vote, and may also have added names of candidates from other lists. The electoral threshold to win a seat was 18%. Landtag members sit for a four-year term. Once formed, the Landtag elected the prime minister and two government councillors who were then appointed by the reigning prince to govern in a cabinet. The prime minister was appointed for a six-year term, while government councillors sit a four-year term. The election was the first in Liechtenstein to use a majority clause, where the party with the most votes would automatically win the most seats. Only men aged 21 and above were eligible to vote.

== Campaign ==
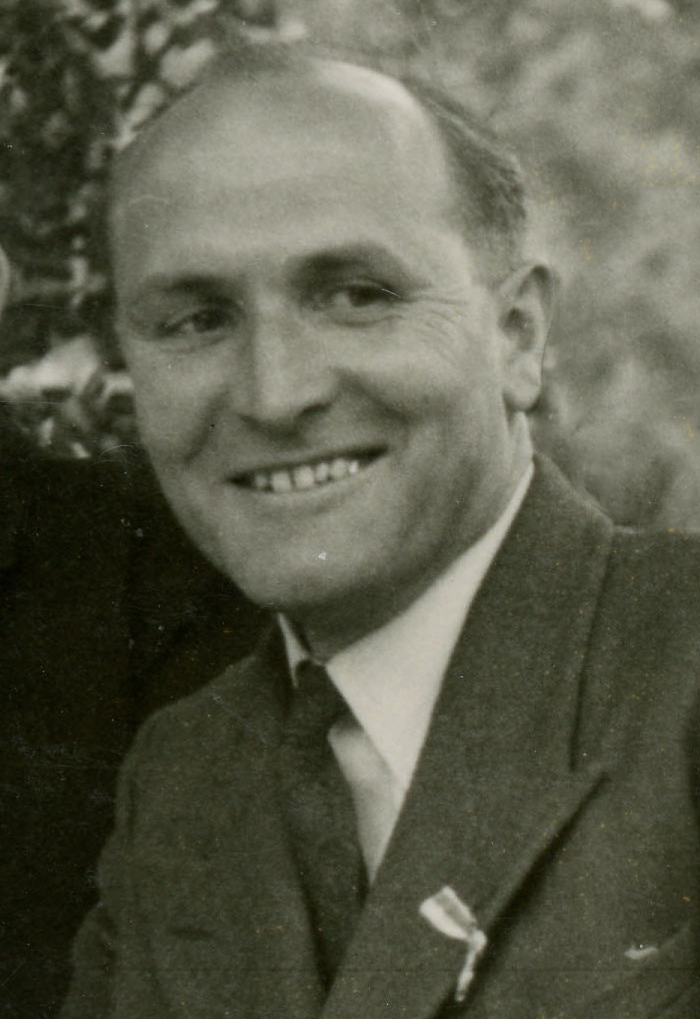
Alexander Frick, pictured in 1954

Both the FBP and VU campaigned in their respective party newspapers, the Liechtensteiner Volksblatt and Liechtensteiner Vaterland. During the election campaign, the FBP highlighted its achievements in office, such as the expansion of the Liechtenstein state budget, supporting agriculture, workers' interests, investing in education, and spending on social welfare. The FBP also highlighted its foreign policy record and asserted that the VU did not have the "confidence" of foreign nations.

On the other hand, the VU appealed to businesspeople, tradespeople, and workers, while campaigning on protecting their interests. The party highlighted the achievements of its predecessor party, the Christian-Social People's Party, and also claimed credit for achievements that had taken place since the formation of the coalition government in 1938, such as in education and road construction. Furthermore, the VU accused the FBP of restricting democratic rights in the 1930s, and also for damaging Liechtenstein's relationship with Switzerland. The VU advocated for policies such as a free market economy, the expansion of welfare benefits, and vocational education.

Due to no workers being represented in the Landtag in the 1949–1953 legislative term, on 5 October 1952 the Liechtenstein Workers' Association voted to create its own electoral group — the List of Workers and Small Farmers (UEK). The group did not consider itself a political party, but rather a list of nonpartisan workers. Its programme included issues such as the expansion of social legislation, European integration, immigration, employment, and affordable housing. Notably, the list included former VU Landtag member Josef Sele.

== Candidates ==
Political parties in Liechtenstein required the support of 30 voters from a constituency to be eligible to nominate a candidate list in it. A total of 39 candidates contested the election.

Oberland	FBP	VU	UEK
Oberland	David Strub; Ernst Risch; Fidel Brunhart; Engelbert Schädler; Franz Josef Schurte; Martin Risch; David Büchel; Raimund Tschol; Albert Schädler	Alois Ritter; Theobald Risch; Johann Wachter; Andreas Vogt; Alois Ospelt; Alois Vogt; Wendelin Beck; Josef Büchel; Ivo Beck	Egon Beck; Albert Frick; Gebhard Kindle; Oskar Gaßner; Alexander Sele; Wilhelm Frick; Josef Hasler; Ferdinand Banzer; Josef Sele
Unterland	FBP	VU	
Unterland	Eugen Schädler; Oswald Bühler; Ernst Büchel; Franz Kind; Rudolf Marxer; Karl Goop	Johann Georg Hasler; Paul Büchel; Josef Kind; Ludwig Marock; Alois Hassler; Gebhard Gerner	
Source: Liechtensteiner Volksblatt

== Results ==
The seat distribution remained unchanged from the 1949 general election, with the FBP winning a majority of eight seats, whereas the VU won seven. The UEK won 8.9% of the vote, but failed to meet the electoral threshold of 18% to win seats in the Landtag. Voter turnout was 90.52%.

Party	Votes	%	Seats	+/–
Progressive Citizens' Party	1,458	50.54	8	0
Patriotic Union	1,229	42.60	7	0
Workers' and Peasants' Party	198	6.86	0	New
Total	2,885	100.00	15	0
Valid votes	2,885	95.62		
Invalid/blank votes	132	4.38		
Total votes	3,017	100.00		
Registered voters/turnout	3,333	90.52		
Source: Vogt

=== By electoral district ===
Electoral district	Seats	Electorate	Party	Elected members	Substitutes	Votes	%	Seats	+/–
Oberland	9	2,194	Patriotic Union	Alois Ritter; Wendelin Beck; Ivo Beck; Josef Büchel; Alois Ospelt	Johann Wachter; Andreas Vogt	867	45.3	5	0
Oberland	9	2,194	Progressive Citizens' Party	Martin Risch; Fidel Brunhart; Ernst Risch; David Strub	Engelbert Schädler; Franz Josef Schurte	849	44.4	4	0
Oberland	9	2,194	Workers' and Peasants' Party	–	–	198	10.3	0	New
Unterland	6	1,139	Progressive Citizens' Party	Eugen Schädler; Ernst Andreas Büchel; Oswald Bühler; Franz Kind	Karl Goop; Rudolf Marxer	609	62.7	4	0
Unterland	6	1,139	Patriotic Union	Alois Hassler; Johann Georg Hasler	Josef Kind; Ludwig Marock	362	37.3	2	0
Source: Vogt

== Aftermath ==
Following the elections, the coalition government between the FBP and VU under the leadership of Frick remained. Upon the establishment of the AHV, the VU demanded a majority of the seven-member administrative composition including its presidency, which the FBP denied. In response, in the first session of the newly elected Landtag on 24 March 1953 the VU members walked out in protest, resulting in the Landtag being dissolved in May and new elections being called.
