= Green Movement =

Green Movement may refer to:

- Green politics, a political ideology
  - Green Movement in Bulgaria
  - Green Movement in India
  - Ukrainian Green movement
  - Green Movement of Sri Lanka
  - The Green Party (Israel), a social-environmental political party formerly known as the Green Movement
- Iranian Green Movement, a political movement after the 2009 Iranian presidential election

== See also ==
- Green Revolution (disambiguation)
