= Alois Ospelt (politician, born 1907) =

Liechtenstein politician (1907–1967)

Member of the Landtag of Liechtenstein for Oberland
- In office 15 February 1953 – 14 June 1953

Personal details
- Born: 2 September 1907; Vaduz, Liechtenstein
- Died: 29 November 1967 (aged 60); Vaduz, Liechtenstein
- Political party: Patriotic Union
- Spouse: Katharina Kindle (m. 1941)

Alois Ospelt (2 September 1907 – 29 November 1967) was a politician from Liechtenstein who served in the Landtag of Liechtenstein in 1953.

He worked as a bricklayer and plasterer. He was a member of the Vaduz municipal council from 1939 to 1942 and was deputy mayor of the municipality from 1945 to 1948. He was the president of the Liechtenstein Workers' Association from 1953 to 1956, but opposed the formation of the Workers' and Peasants' Party from the LWA to contest the February 1953 Liechtenstein general election and instead ran for election as a member of the Patriotic Union. He was a deputy member of the Landtag from 1953 to 1957.

He died of an unspecified disease on 29 November 1967, aged 60.

== Bibliography ==
- Vogt, Paul (1987). 125 Jahre Landtag (in German). Vaduz: Landtag of the Principality of Liechtenstein.
