= Henry Bernstein =

Henry Bernstein may refer to:

- Henri Bernstein (1876–1953), French playwright
- Henry Bernstein (sociologist) (born 1945), British sociologist
- Sir Henry Bernstein (died 1857), theologian, orientalist, Fellow of the Royal Society of Edinburgh

== See also ==
- Harry Bernstein (1910–2011), British-born American writer
