= Workers and Peasants Party =

Workers and Peasants Party may refer to:

- Workers and Peasants Party (Egypt)
- Workers and Peasants Party (France)
- Workers and Peasants Party (India)
- Workers' and Peasants' Party (Japan)
- Workers' and Peasants' Party (Liechtenstein)
- Workers' and Peasants' Party (Philippines)

== See also ==
- Workers Party (disambiguation)
- Peasants Party (disambiguation)
