= Sedentism =

Transition from nomadic lifestyle to a society that remains in one place permanently

In anthropology, sedentism (sometimes called sedentariness; compare sedentarism) is the practice of living in one place for a long time. As of 2026, the large majority of people belong to sedentary cultures. In evolutionary anthropology and archaeology, sedentism takes on a slightly different sub-meaning, often applying to the transition from nomadic society to a lifestyle that involves remaining in one place permanently. Essentially, sedentism means living in groups permanently in one place. The invention of agriculture led to sedentism in many cases, but the earliest sedentary settlements were pre-agricultural.

== Initial requirements for permanent, non-agricultural settlements ==
For small-scale nomadic societies it can be difficult to adopt a sedentary lifestyle in a landscape without on-site agricultural or livestock breeding resources, since sedentism often requires sufficient year-round, easily accessible local natural resources.

Non-agricultural sedentism requires good preservation and storage technologies, such as smoking, drying, and fermentation, as well as good containers such as pottery, baskets, or special pits in which to securely store food whilst making it available. It was only in locations where the resources of several major ecosystems overlapped that the earliest non-agricultural sedentism occurred. For example, people settled where a river met the sea, at lagoon environments along the coast, at river confluences, or where flat savanna met hills, and mountains with rivers.

== Criteria for the recognition of sedentism in archaeological studies ==
In archaeology a number of criteria must hold for the recognition of either semi or full sedentism.

According to archaeologist Ofer Bar-Yosef, they are as follows:

1. Increasing presence of organisms that benefit from human sedentary activities, e.g.

- House mice
- Rats
- Sparrows

2. Cementum increments on mammal teeth

- Indications that hunting took place in both winter and summer

3. Energy expenditure

- Leveling slopes
- Building houses
- Production of plaster
- Transport of undressed stones
- Digging of graves
- Shaping of large mortars

In many mammals dark cementum is deposited during winter when food is scarce and light cementum is deposited in the summer when food is abundant, so the outermost cementum layer shows at which season the animal was killed. Thus, if animals were killed year-round in some area it suggests that people were sedentary there.

== Historical regions of sedentary settlements ==
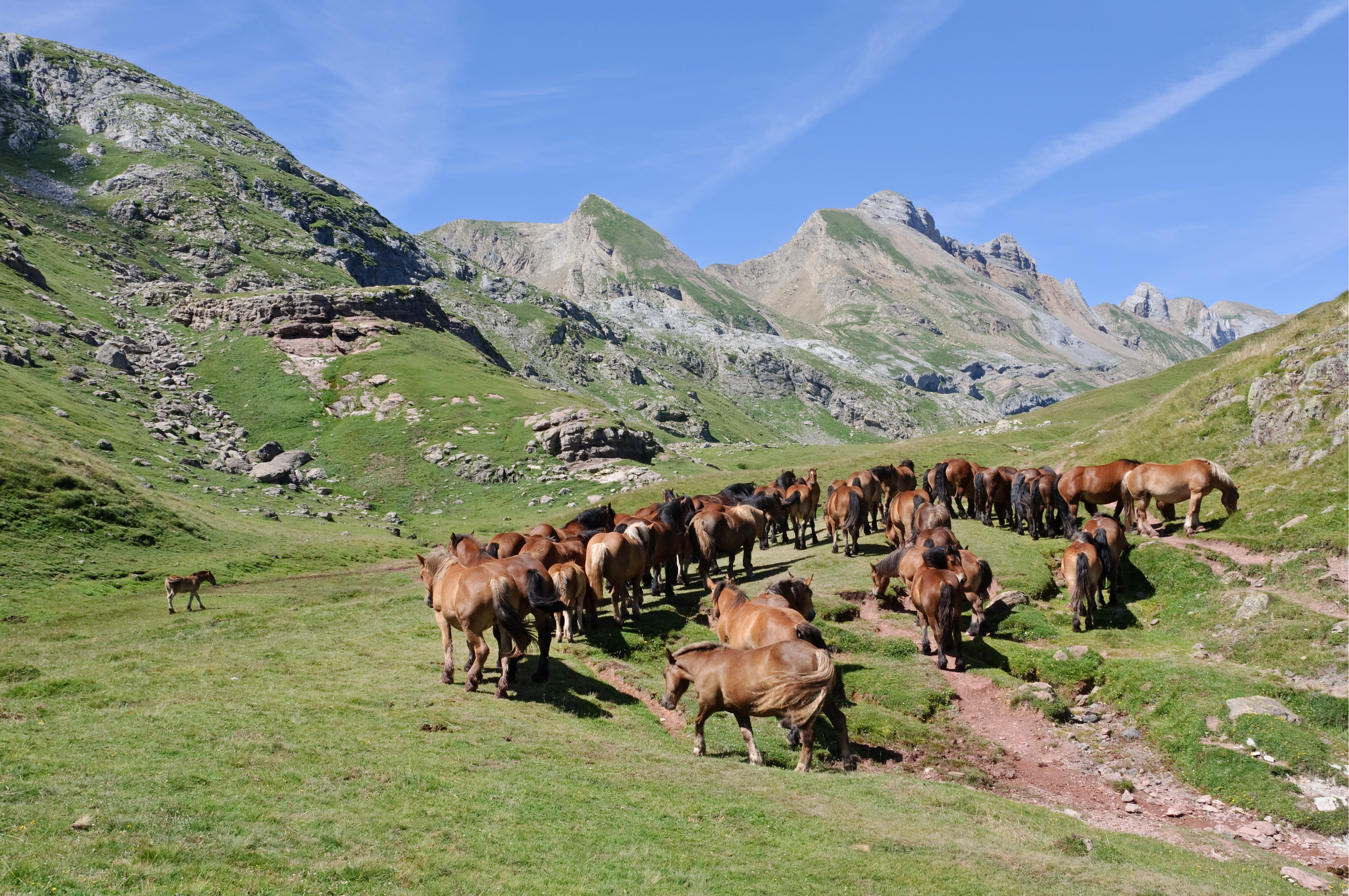
Herd of horses on summer mountain pasture in the Pyrenees

Regions of origin of sedentary life: north central Europe, northeast Asia, and the fertile crescent

The first sedentary sites were pre-agricultural, and they appeared during the Upper Paleolithic in Moravia and on the East European Plain between c. 25000–17000 BC. In the Levant, the Natufian culture was the first to become sedentary at around 12000 BC. The Natufians were sedentary for more than 2000 years before they, at some sites, started to cultivate plants around 10000 BC. A year-round sedentary site, with its larger population, generates a substantial demand on locally provided natural resources, a demand that may have triggered the development of deliberate agriculture.

The Jōmon culture in Japan, which was primarily a coastal culture, was sedentary from c. 12000 to 10000 BC, before the cultivation of rice at some sites in northern Kyushu. In northernmost Scandinavia, there are several early sedentary sites without evidence of agriculture or cattle breeding. They appeared from c. 5300–4500 BC and are all located optimally in the landscape for utilization of major ecosystem resources; for example, the Lillberget Stone Age village site (c. 3900 BC), the Nyelv site (c. 5300 BC), and the Lake Inari site (c. 4500 BC). In northern Sweden the earliest indication of agriculture occurs at previously sedentary sites, and one example is the Bjurselet site used during the period c. 2700–1700 BC, famous for its large caches of long distance traded flint axes from Denmark and Scania (some 1300 km). The evidence of small-scale agriculture at that site can be seen from c. 2300 BC (burnt cereals of barley).

== Historical effects of increased sedentism ==
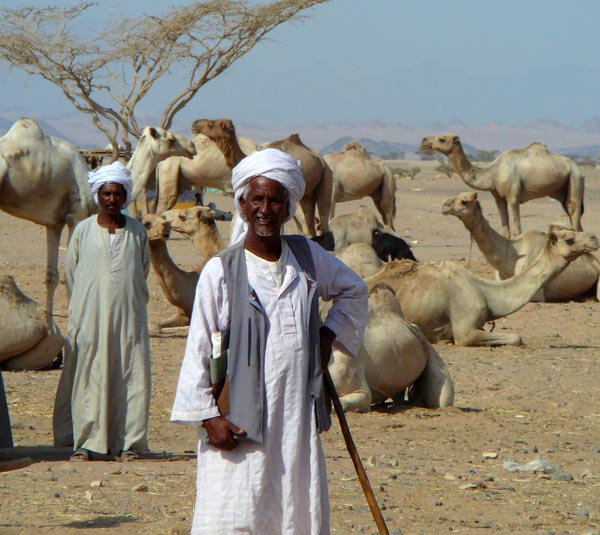
Beja nomads from Northeast Africa

Sedentism increased contacts and trade, and the first Middle East cereals and cattle in Europe could have spread through a stepping-stone process, where the productive gifts (cereals, cattle, sheep and goats) were exchanged through a network of large pre-agricultural sedentary sites (rather than through a wave of an advancing spread of people with agricultural economy) and where the smaller sites found in-between the bigger sedentary ones did not get any of the new products. Not all contemporary sites during a certain period (after the first sedentism occurred at one site) were sedentary. Evaluation of habitational sites in northern Sweden indicates that less than 10 percent of all the sites around 4000 BC were sedentary. At the same time, only 0.5 to 1 percent of these represented villages with more than 3 to 4 houses. This means that the old nomadic or migratory life style continued in a parallel fashion for several thousand years, until somewhat more sites turned to sedentism, and gradually switched over to agricultural sedentism.

The shift to sedentism is coupled with the adoption of new subsistence-strategies, specifically moving from foraging (hunter-gatherer) to agricultural and animal domestication. The development of sedentism led to the rise of population aggregation and the formation of villages, cities, and other community types.

Deleuze and Guattari detect a trend in mental bias resulting from sedentism: "History is always written from the sedentary point of view and in the name of a unitary State apparatus, at least a possible one, even when the topic is nomads."

In South America, sedentism may date from 5500 BC.

In North America, the earliest examples of sedentism are from the middle archaic period. One example of early substantial construction is Watson Brake. Radiocarbon dating, coring and luminescence dating show that minor earthworks begun here around 3500 BC with substanical earthraising starting around 3350 BC. Analysis of floral and faunal remains indicate all-season occupation and consequently can suggest sedentism of its inhabitants.

== Forced sedentism ==
Forced sedentism or sedentarization occurs when a dominant group restricts the movements of a nomadic group. Nomadic populations have undergone such a process since the first cultivation of land; the organization of modern society has imposed demands that have pushed aboriginal populations to adopt a fixed habitat.

At the end of the 19th and throughout the 20th century many previously nomadic tribes turned to permanent settlement. It was a process initiated by local governments, and it was mainly a global trend forced by the changes in the attitude to the land and real property and also due to state policies that complicated border crossing. Among these nations are Negev Bedouin in Jordan, Israel and Egypt, Bashkirs, Kyrgyz, Kazakhs, Evenks, Evens, Sakha in the Soviet Union, some Kurdish tribes in Turkey, Tibetan nomads in China, Babongo in Gabon, Baka in Cameroon, Innu in Canada, Romani in Romania and Czechoslovakia, etc.

As a result of forced sedentarization, many rich herdsmen in Siberia have been eliminated by deliberate overtaxation or imprisonment, year-round mobility has been discouraged, many smaller sites and family herd camps have been shut down, children have been separated from their parents and taken to boarding schools. This caused severe social, cultural and psychological issues to Indigenous peoples of Siberia.

== See also ==
- Nacirema people
- Western culture
- Indian reservation
- Negev Bedouin
- Nomad
- Seasonal human migration
- Timeline of agriculture and food technology
- Transhumance
