= Peasants' Party =

Peasants' Party or Peasant Party may refer to one of the following political parties:

- Croatian Democratic Peasant Party
- Croatian Peasant Party
- Croatian Peasant Party of Stjepan Radić (Bosnia and Herzegovina)
- Peasant Party (Taiwan)
- People's Peasant Party, Serbia
- Polish People's Party
- Peasants' Party, Poland
- Peasant Party of Ukraine

== Former parties ==
- Bavarian Peasants' League (1893-1933)
- Belarusian Peasant Party (1991-1999)
- Bessarabian Peasants' Party (1918-1923)
- Peasants' Party of Italy (1920-1963)
- Peasants' Party of Slovakia (1989-1997)
- Peasants' Party (Romania) (1918-1926)
  - National Peasants' Party (1926-1947)
  - Socialist Peasants' Party (1938-1944)
- Peasant Party of Russia (1990-1999)
- Ukrainian Peasant Democratic Party (1991-2011)
- Workers' and Peasants' Party (Liechtenstein) (1940s-1950s)

== See also ==
- Agrarian Party (disambiguation)
- Democratic Peasants' Party (disambiguation)
- Workers and Peasants Party (disambiguation)
