= Terence J. Byres =

British sociologist

Terence J. Byres is a peasant studies scholar and a professor emeritus of Political Economy at the School of Oriental and African Studies, University of London. Byres was a founding editor of the Journal of Development Studies (1964), the Journal of Peasant Studies (1973) and Journal of Agrarian Change (2001).

== Selected publications ==
- Byres, T.J. (1996) Capitalism From Above and Capitalism From Below. An Essay in Comparative Political Economy. London: Macmillan.

== Festschrift ==
Bernstein, Henry and Brass, Tom (Eds)(1996) Agrarian Questions: Essays in Appreciation of T.J.Byres (Library of Peasant Studies), Routledge (A collection of nine essays was prepared to mark the 60th birthday of Terry Byres)
