= UEK =

UEK may refer to:

- Bergier commission, investigation of links between Nazi Germany and Swiss banks
- Kraków University of Economics, business school in Poland
- List of Workers and Small Farmers, electoral group in Liechtenstein
- Unbreakable Enterprise Kernel, Linux kernel
- Union of Protestant Churches in the EKD, organization of churches in Germany
