= Farm electricity =

Farm electricity can refer to:

- Rural electrification
- Electrical energy efficiency on United States farms
- Solar farm
- Wind farm
