= Green Revolution (disambiguation) =

The Green Revolution was a massive increase in agricultural yields between 1943 and 1970 that occurred worldwide.

Green Revolution may also refer to:

- The Green Revolution in India, a massive increase in agricultural products in India
- The 2009 Iranian presidential election protests, an attempted revolution after Iran's 2009 presidential election
- The rise of Muammar Gaddafi's regime in Libya
  - 1969 Libyan Revolution
- Environmental Revolution, an ongoing process of mitigation of climate change and use of sustainable technologies
- Second Green Revolution, an ongoing change in agricultural production

== See also ==
- Green Movement (disambiguation)
- Agronomic revolution
- Agrarian revolution (disambiguation)
- Agricultural revolution (disambiguation)
- Revolution (disambiguation)
- Green (disambiguation)
