= June 1953 Liechtenstein general election =

- 14 June 1953
- All 15 seats in the Landtag; 8 seats needed for a majority
- Turnout: 93.41% (▲2.89pp)
Party	Leader	Vote %	Seats	+/–
FBP	Alexander Frick	50.43	8	0
VU	Otto Schaedler	49.57	7	0
This lists parties that won seats. See the complete results below.
Results by constituency
Prime Minister before	Prime Minister after
Alexander Frick; FBP	Alexander Frick; FBP

General elections were held in Liechtenstein on 14 June 1953 to elect the 15 members of the Landtag. Early elections were called after the Patriotic Union (VU) members of the Landtag resigned over a dispute regarding the administrative composition of the old age and survivors' insurance (AHV) office in Liechtenstein. The Progressive Citizens' Party (FBP) won eight seats and retained its majority, while the VU won seven. Voter turnout was 93.4%.

Similarly to previous elections, the election campaign was characterized by accusations from both parties. Following the elections, the coalition government between the FBP and VU led by prime minister Alexander Frick remained. The election resulted in the highest vote share for the VU to that point, and as a result the FBP conceded to the VU's demands regarding the AHV.

== Background ==
In the February 1953 elections, the Progressive Citizens' Party (FBP) retained its majority of eight seats, while the Patriotic Union (VU) won seven. The coalition government under the leadership of prime minister Alexander Frick remained.

Frick's second term oversaw continued steps towards reforming Liechtenstein into a modern welfare state. Notably, in 1952 the old age and survivors' insurance (AHV) office in Liechtenstein, a mandatory life insurance scheme, was established after a successful referendum despite opposition from peasant workers. Upon the establishment of the office, the VU demanded a majority of the seven-member administrative composition including its presidency, citing the party's strong electoral position and the FBP already holding a majority of the boards of the National Bank of Liechtenstein and Liechtensteinische Kraftwerke. The FBP rejected this demand and thus in the first session of the newly-elected Landtag on 24 March 1953 the VU members walked out in protest, resulting in the Landtag being dissolved in May and new elections being called.

== Electoral system ==
The 15 members of the Landtag were elected by open list proportional representation from two constituencies, Oberland with 9 seats and Unterland with 6 seats. Voters voted for a party list and then may have struck through candidates for whom they did not wish to cast a preferential vote, and may also have added names of candidates from other lists. The electoral threshold to win a seat was 18%. Landtag members sit for a four-year term. Once formed, the Landtag elected the prime minister and two government councillors who were then appointed by the reigning prince to govern in a cabinet. The prime minister was appointed for a six-year term, while government councillors sit a four-year term. The election was the first in Liechtenstein to use a majority clause, where the party with the most votes would automatically win the most seats. Only men aged 21 and above were eligible to vote.

== Campaign ==
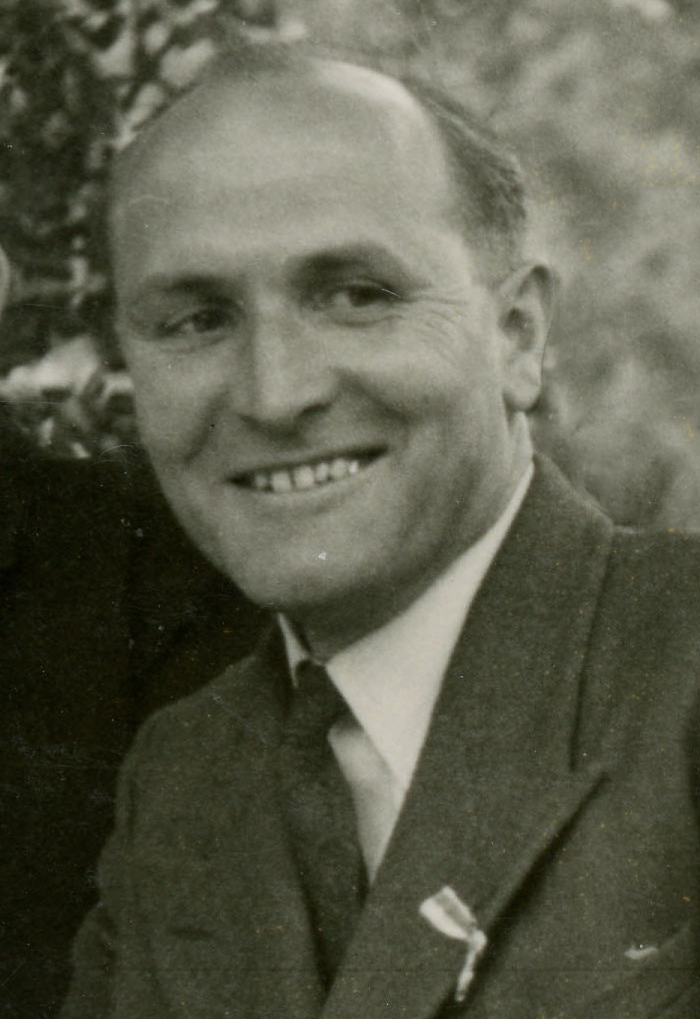
Alexander Frick, pictured in 1954

Both the FBP and VU campaigned on their respective party newspapers, the Liechtensteiner Volksblatt and Liechtensteiner Vaterland. The FBP accused the VU of acting arbitrarily and lying when criticizing members of the former. In addition, Frick defended the FBP's claim to the board of the AHV as being inline with Liechtenstein's proportional representation system. The party campaigned on issues such as protecting workers' interests and expanding education, including vocational education.

Conversely, the VU continued to argue its right to the majority of the AHV board and accused the FBP of conducting a "brutal, power-hungry game" in the Landtag and undermining Liechtenstein's interests. The VU appealed to workers and highlighted the party's achievements in improving worker conditions, in addition to claiming credit for the introduction of the AHV. During the election campaign, according to the Volksblatt, the VU accused Frick of misconduct as prime minister, but the FBP asserted that such claims were false.

== Candidates ==
Political parties in Liechtenstein required the support of 30 voters from a constituency to be eligible to nominate a candidate list in it. A total of 30 candidates contested the election.

Oberland	FBP	VU
Oberland	David Strub; Ernst Risch; Fidel Brunhart; Martin Risch; Albert Schädler; Engelbert Schädler; Raimund Tschol; David Büchel; Franz Josef Schurte	Alois Ritter; Alois Ospelt; Johann Wachter; Andreas Vogt; Wendelin Beck; Josef Büchel; Johann Beck; Alois Vogt; Ivo Beck
Unterland	FBP	VU
Unterland	Eugen Schädler; Oswald Bühler; Ernst Büchel; Franz Kind; Rudolf Marxer; Karl Goop	Johann Georg Hasler; Paul Büchel; Josef Kind; Ludwig Marock; Alois Hassler; Gebhard Gerner
Source: Liechtensteiner Vaterland

== Results ==
The seat distribution remained unchanged from the February 1953 elections, with the FBP winning a majority of eight seats, whereas the VU won seven. Voter turnout was 93.41%.

Party	Votes	%	Seats	+/–
Progressive Citizens' Party	1,568	50.43	8	0
Patriotic Union	1,541	49.57	7	0
Total	3,109	100.00	15	0
Valid votes	3,109	97.95		
Invalid/blank votes	65	2.05		
Total votes	3,174	100.00		
Registered voters/turnout	3,398	93.41		
Source: Vogt

=== By electoral district ===
Electoral district	Seats	Electorate	Party	Elected members	Substitutes	Votes	%	Seats	+/–
Oberland	9	2,261	Patriotic Union	Alois Vogt; Andreas Vogt; Alois Ritter; Johann Beck; Ivo Beck	Josef Büchel; Alois Ospelt	1,104	53.5	5	0
Oberland	9	2,261	Progressive Citizens' Party	David Strub; Martin Risch; Ernst Risch; Fidel Brunhart	Engelbert Schädler; Albert Schädler	959	46.5	4	0
Unterland	6	1,137	Progressive Citizens' Party	Eugen Schädler; Ernst Andreas Büchel; Franz Kind; Oswald Bühler	Rudolf Marxer; Karl Goop	609	58.2	4	0
Unterland	6	1,137	Patriotic Union	Gebhard Gerner; Paul Büchel	Josef Kind; Johann Georg Hasler	437	41.8	2	0
Source: Vogt

== Aftermath ==
Following the elections, the coalition government between the FBP and VU under the leadership of Frick remained. The VU received its highest vote share to that point in the election, receiving only 27 less votes than the FBP. Due to this, the FBP conceded to the VU's demands and allowed for the party to hold a majority of the administrative composition of the AHV.
