= Agricultural revolution =

Agricultural revolution may refer to:

- First Agricultural Revolution (circa 10,000 BC), the prehistoric transition from hunting and gathering to settled agriculture (also known as the Neolithic Revolution)
- Arab Agricultural Revolution (8th–13th century), The spread of new crops and advanced techniques in the Muslim world
- British Agricultural Revolution (17th–19th century), an unprecedented increase in agricultural productivity in Great Britain (also known as the Second Agricultural Revolution)
- Scottish Agricultural Revolution (17th–19th century), the transformation into a modern and productive system
- Green Revolution (1930s–1960s), an increase in agricultural production, especially in the developing world (also known as the Third Agricultural Revolution)

== See also ==
- Collective farming
- Land reform
- Precision agriculture
- Agrarian revolution (disambiguation)
- Green Revolution (disambiguation)
- Cambrian substrate revolution
- Revolution (disambiguation)
- Agriculture
- Agrarian change
- Secondary products revolution
