= Agrarian system =

Dynamic set of economic and technological factors that affect agricultural practices

An agrarian system is the dynamic set of economic and technological factors that affect agricultural practices. It is premised on the idea that different systems have developed depending on the natural and social conditions specific to a particular region. Political factors also have a bearing on an agrarian system due to issues such as land ownership, labor organization, and forms of cultivation.

As food security has become more important, mostly due to the explosive population growth during the 20th century, the efficiency of agrarian systems has come under greater review.

== Types ==
The basis for a prevailing agrarian system may be derived from one of a number of major types, including agrarian social structure, for example, tribal or ethnic divisions, feudal classes or family based systems. Farming methods such as migratory herding of livestock are a common framework for which an agrarian system may evolve. Other important kinds of system are based on the dominant political ideology such as communism or agrarian socialism.

Europe is dominated by mixed farming. This has meant careful management of tillage practices and good tools and implements were important. China developed an agrarian system based on labor-intensive wet rice cultivation where skill was paramount.

== Regional examples ==
The Ottoman agrarian system was based around the tapu, which involved a permanent lease of state-owned arable land to a peasant family. In Haiti there was a social system based on collective labor teams, called kounbit, where farms were run by nuclear families and exchanges. This was replaced by smaller groups, called eskouad, who operated on a reciprocal basis or conducted collective labor to other peasants for a price.

In the 20th century the distribution of land ownership in rural Egypt had become grossly unequal. An overwhelming majority of land owners possessed small parcels of land while a small minority owned large farms. Many of the rural poor were landless. By the middle of the century the calls for agrarian reform grew. Tenancy reforms, including rent control and minimum wage legislation were enacted with mixed results.

In Nigeria, the Igbo people developed an agrarian system in which some farmers became traders. Their emphasis on small-scale, entrepreneurial capitalism was fundamental to Nigerian Independence.

== See also ==
- Agrarian Reform Laws of Cuba
- List of basic agriculture topics
- Right to food
- Social cycle theory
- Sustainable agriculture
- Agrarian structure
