= Agrarian Party =

Agrarian Party is the name of several political parties:

== Current political parties ==
- Environmentalist Agrarian Party, Albania
- Agrarian Party of Belarus
- Agrarian Party of Kazakhstan
- Agrarian Party of Moldova, from 1991 to 1998
- Agrarian Party (Norway)
- Agrarian Party (Panama), in Chiriqui Province in the 1920s and 1940s
- Spanish Agrarian Party, during the Second Republic, known as the Agrarian Party (Partido Agrario) until 1934
- Agrarian Party (Tajikistan)
- Agrarian Party of Ukraine
- Agrarian party of Turkmenistan (In Turkmen: Türkmenistanyň agrar partiýasy)

== Former political parties ==
- Bulgarian Agrarian National Union, Bulgaria (1899–1946)
- Chilean Agrarian Party (1931–1945), a political party in Chile, formed in 1931 and dissolved in 1945 to form the Agrarian Labor Party
- Agrarian Labor Party, Chile (1945–1958)
- Republican Party of Farmers and Peasants, also known as the Agrarian Party of Czechoslovakia (1899–1938)
- Finnish Agrarian Party, Finland (1959–1995)
- Agrarian Party (Hungary)
- Agrarian Party (Italy)
- Agrarian Party of Russia, Russia (1993–2008)
- Agrarian Party of Yugoslavia, Yugoslavia (pre-1945)

== See also ==
- Agrarian (disambiguation)
- Farmers' Party (disambiguation)
- Agrarianism, as a political ideology, has however been the basis for many more parties
- Peasants' Party (disambiguation), a name also used by agrarian parties, but not limited to them
- List of agrarian parties
