= Second Green Revolution =

Proposed change in agricultural production

The Second Green Revolution is a change in agricultural production widely thought necessary to feed and sustain the growing population on Earth. These calls came about as a response to rising food commodity prices and fears of peak oil, among other factors.

It is named after the Green Revolution.

== Usage ==
A 1981 article by Peter Steinhart used the term Second Green Revolution to describe future widespread adoption of genetic engineering of new food crops for increased crop yield and nutrition. Sakiko Fukuda-Parr's 2006 book The Gene Revolution: GM Crops and Unequal Development also explored this concept.

Others have used the term to refer to a combination of urban agriculture, smaller farm size and organic agriculture with the aim of increasing resource sustainability of crop production.

== Proponents ==
Bill Gates has been among the proponents of a second green revolution, saying:

Three quarters of the world's poorest people get their food and income by farming small plots of land...if we can make smallholder farming more productive and more profitable, we can have a massive impact on hunger and nutrition and poverty...the charge is clear—we have to develop crops that can grow in a drought; that can survive in a flood; that can resist pests and disease...we need higher yields on the same land in harsher weather."

Gates made these remarks during the World Food Prize. He has made over US$1.4 billion in contributions towards agricultural developments.

== Opponents ==
Some opponents of the Second Green Revolution believe that social inequity is a major factor leading to food insecurity, one which is not addressed by increasing food production capacity.

== See also ==
- Plant breeding
- Transgenic plant
- Urban agriculture
- Future food technology
- Agricultural robot
- Cultured meat
- Blue revolution, aquaculture
