= Timeline of agriculture and food technology =

History of crop and animal domestication

== Paleolithic ==
- 30,600 BC – Pestle used as a tool in southern Italy to grind oats.

== Neolithic Revolution ==
- 8,500 BC – Neolithic Revolution in the ancient Near East
- 8,000 BC – domesticated wheat at PPNA sites in the Levant
- 7500 BC – PPNB sites across the Fertile Crescent growing wheat, barley, chickpeas, peas, beans, flax and bitter vetch. Sheep and goat domesticated.
- 7000 BC – agriculture had reached southern Europe with evidence of emmer and einkorn wheat, barley, sheep, goats, and pigs suggest that a food producing economy is adopted in Greece and the Aegean.
- 7000 BC – Cultivation of wheat, sesame, barley, and eggplant in Mehrgarh (modern day Pakistan).
- 7000 BC – Domestication of cattle and chicken in Mehrgarh, modern day Pakistan.
- 6800 BC – Rice domesticated in southeast Asia.
- 6500 BC – Evidence of cattle domestication in Turkey. Some sources say this happened earlier in other parts of the world.
- 6001 BC – Archaeological evidence from various sites on the Iberian Peninsula suggest the domestication of plants and animals.
- 6000 BC – Granary built in Mehrgarh for storage of excess food.
- 5500 BC – Céide Fields in Ireland are the oldest known field systems in the world, this landscape consists of extensive tracts of land enclosed by brick walls.
- 5200 BC – In the heart of the Sahara Desert, several native species were domesticated, most importantly pearl millet, sorghum and cowpeas, which spread through West Africa and the Sahel. At this time the Sahara was covered in grassland that received plenty of rainfall, it was far more moist and densely populated than today.
- 4000 BC – In Mehrgarh, the domestication of numerous crops, including peas, sesame seeds, dates, and cotton, as well as a wide range of domestic animals, including the Domestic Asian Water Buffalo, an animal that remains essential to intensive agricultural production throughout Asia today.
- 4000 BC – Egyptians discover how to make bread using yeast
- 4000 BC – First use of light wooden ploughs in Mesopotamia (Modern day Iraq)
- 3500 BC – Irrigation was being used in Mesopotamia (Modern day Iraq)
- 3500 BC – First agriculture in the Americas, around Central Amazonia or Ecuador
- 3000 BC – Turmeric, cardamom, pepper and mustard are harvested in the Indus Valley civilisation.
- 3000 BC – Fermentation of dough, grain, and fruit juices is in practice.
- 3000 BC – Sugar produced in India

== Antiquity ==
- 2600 BC – Large-scale commercial timbering of cedars in Phoenicia (Lebanon) for export to Egypt and Sumeria. Similar commercial timbering in South India.
- 1700 BC – Wind powered machine developed by the Babylonians
- 1500 BC – Seed drill in Babylonia
- 1300 BC – Creation of canal linking the Nile delta to the Red Sea
- 691 BC – First aqueduct (approx. 50 miles long) constructed to bring water to Nineveh.
- 530 BC – Tunnel of Eupalinos first underground aqueduct
- 500 BC – The moldboard iron plough is invented in China
- 500 BC – Row cultivation of crops using intensive hoeing to weed and conserve moisture practised in China
- 300 BC – Efficient trace harness for plowing invented in China
- 200 BC – Efficient collar harness for plowing invented in China
- 100 BC – Rotary winnowing fan invented in China
- 100 BC – The multi-tube seed drill is invented in China
- AD 200 – The fishing reel invented in China
- 600 – The distillation of alcohol in China
- 607 – The Chinese begin constructing a massive canal system to connect the Yellow and Yangtze rivers

== Modern technological advances ==
- 1700 – British Agricultural Revolution ends
- 1763 – International "Potato Show" in Paris with corn varieties from different states
- 1804 – Vincenzo Dandolo writes several treatises of agriculture and sericulture.
- 1809 – French confectioner Nicolas Appert invents canning
- 1837 – John Deere invents steel plough
- 1866 – Gregor Mendel publishes his paper describing Mendelian inheritance
- 1871 – Louis Pasteur invents pasteurization
- 1895 – Refrigeration for domestic and commercial drink preservation introduced in the United States and the United Kingdom, respectively.
- 1913 – The Haber process, also called the Haber–Bosch process, made it possible to produce ammonia, and thereby fertilize, on an industrial scale.
- 1960 – First use with aerial photos in Earth sciences and agriculture.
- 1988 - First use of the Global Positioning System in agricultural applications, precision farming emerges.

== Green Revolution ==
- 1944 – Green Revolution begins in Mexico
- 1974 – China creates the first hybrid rice. See Yuan Longping.
- 2000 – Genetically modified plants cultivated around the world.
- 2005 – Lasers used to replace stickers by writing on food to "track and trace" and identify individual pieces of a fresh fruit.

== See also ==
- Agricultural revolution (disambiguation)
- Agriculture
- Broad spectrum revolution
- Corporate farming
- Electrical energy efficiency on United States farms
- Fertile Crescent
- History of agriculture
- Neolithic founder crops
- New World crops
- History of genetic engineering
- Timeline of historic inventions
