= Agrarian change =

Agrarian change is the process by which the political economy of the agrarian sector alters in some way. It involves changes in the social relations and dynamics of production, power relations in agrarian formations and ownership structures in the agricultural sector of an economy. The kind of dimensions covered in the study of this typically include not only technological and institutional forms such as agricultural productivity and farm-size and organisation; land reform; paths of capitalist transition; the politics of transnational agrarian social movements; the environmental contradictions of capitalist agriculture; global value chains and commodity certification schemes; the agrarian roots of violence and conflict; and migration and rural labour markets but also issues around gender, migration and rural labor markets, social differentiation and class formation.

Agrarian change as an academic subject is covered in a wide range of academic journals and books including for example: Journal of Agrarian Change; The Journal of Peasant Studies; Bernstein, H., (2010) Class dynamics of agrarian change. Halifax: Fernwood Publishing; Grigg, D. B. (1980). Population growth and agrarian change: an historical perspective. CUP; and Griffin, K. (1979). The political economy of agrarian change: An essay on the Green Revolution. Springer.
