= Farm =

Area of land used to produce food and crops

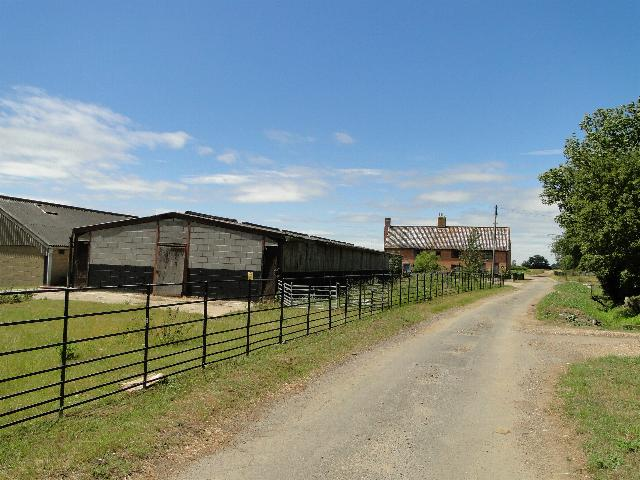
Church farm in Norfolk, England

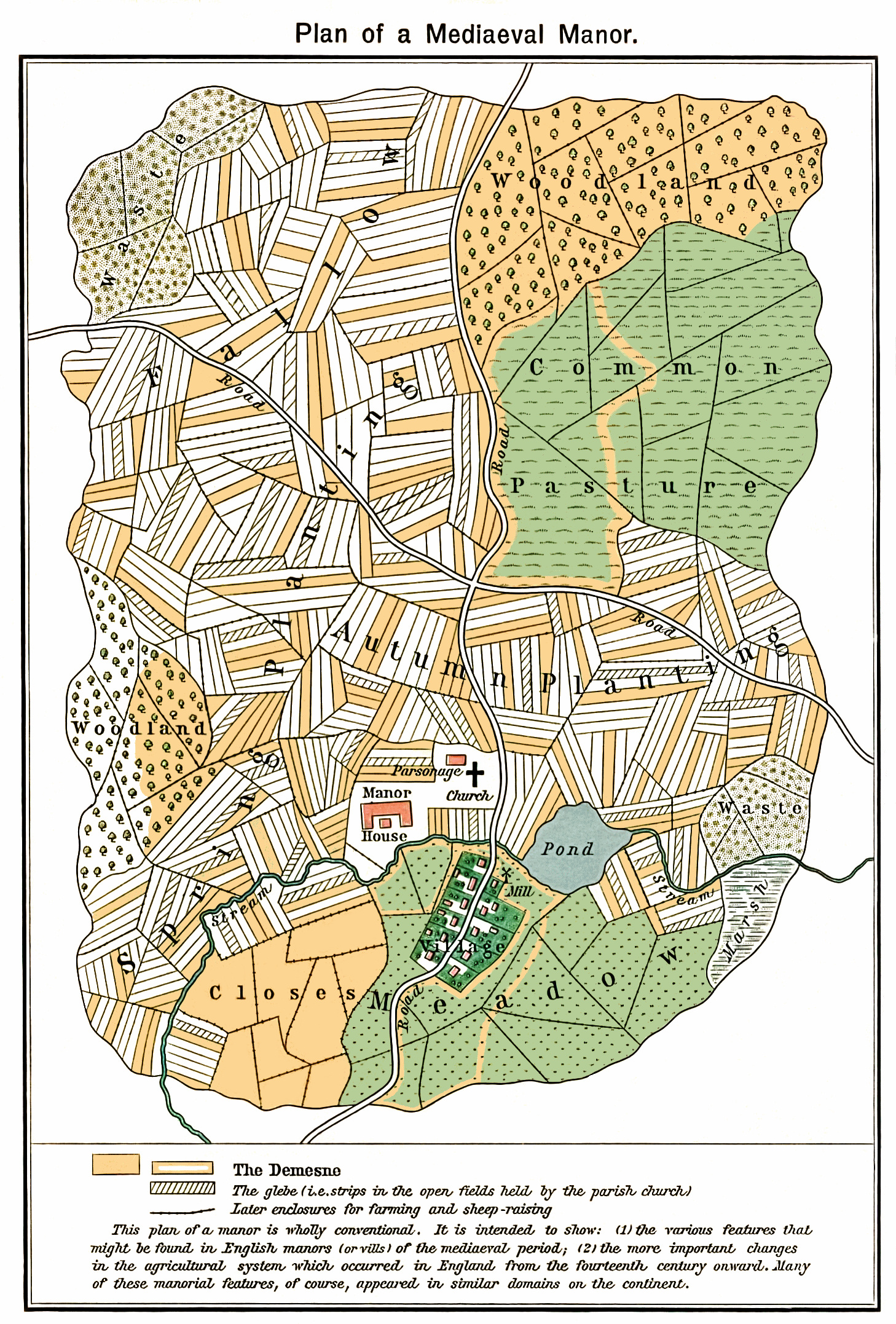
Typical plan of a medieval English manor, showing the use of field strips

A farm (also called an agricultural holding) is an area of land that is devoted primarily to agricultural processes with the primary objective of producing food and other crops; it is the basic facility in food production. The name is used for specialized units such as arable farms, vegetable farms, fruit farms, dairy, pig and poultry farms, and land used for the production of natural fiber, biofuel, and other biobased products. It includes ranches, feedlots, orchards, plantations and estates, smallholdings, and hobby farms, and includes the farmhouse and agricultural buildings as well as the land. In modern times, the term has been extended to include such industrial operations as wind farms and fish farms, both of which can operate on land or at sea.

There are about 570 million farms in the world, most of which are small and family-operated. Small farms with a land area of fewer than 2 hectares operate on about 12% of the world's agricultural land, and family farms comprise about 75% of the world's agricultural land.

Modern farms in developed countries are highly mechanized. In the United States, livestock may be raised on rangeland and finished in feedlots, and the mechanization of crop production has brought about a great decrease in the number of agricultural workers needed. In Europe, traditional family farms are giving way to larger production units. In Australia, some farms are very large because the land is unable to support a high stocking density of livestock because of climatic conditions. In less developed countries, small farms are the norm, and the majority of rural residents are subsistence farmers, feeding their families and selling any surplus products in the local market.

== Etymology ==
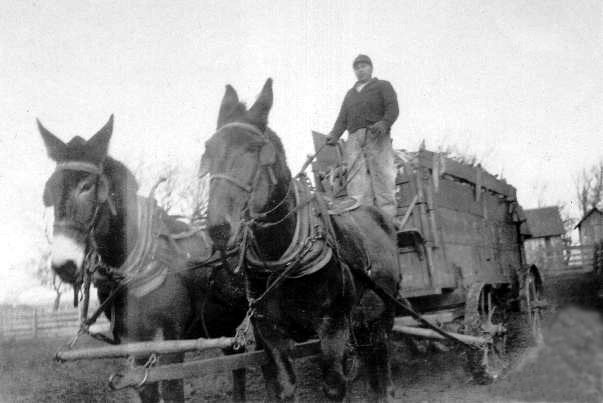
A farmer harvesting crops with mule-drawn wagon, 1920s, Iowa, US

The word in the sense of an agricultural land-holding derives from the verb "to farm" a revenue source, whether taxes, customs, rents of a group of manors or simply to hold an individual manor by the feudal land tenure of "fee farm". The word is from the medieval Latin noun firma, also the source of the French word ferme, meaning a fixed agreement, contract, from the classical Latin adjective firmus meaning strong, stout, firm. As in the medieval age virtually all manors were engaged in the business of agriculture, which was their principal revenue source, so to hold a manor by the tenure of "fee farm" became synonymous with the practice of agriculture itself.

== History ==
Map of the world showing approximate centers of origin of agriculture and its spread in prehistory: the Fertile Crescent (11,000 BP), the Yangtze and Yellow River basins (9,000 BP), and the New Guinea Highlands (9,000–6,000 BP), Central Mexico (5,000–4,000 BP), Northern South America (5,000–4,000 BP), sub-Saharan Africa (5,000–4,000 BP, exact location unknown), eastern North America (4,000–3,000 BP).

Farming has been innovated at multiple different points and places in human history. The transition from hunter-gatherer to settled, agricultural societies is called the Neolithic Revolution and first began around 12,000 years ago, near the beginning of the geological epoch of the Holocene around 12,000 years ago. It was the world's first historically verifiable revolution in agriculture. Farming spread from the Middle East to Europe and by 4,000 BC people that lived in the central part of Europe were using oxen to pull plows and wagons. Subsequent step-changes in human farming practices were provoked by the British Agricultural Revolution in the 18th century, and the Green Revolution of the second half of the 20th century.

Farming originated independently in different parts of the world, as hunter-gatherer societies transitioned to food production rather than food capture. It may have started about 12,000 years ago with the domestication of livestock in the Fertile Crescent in western Asia, soon to be followed by the cultivation of crops. Modern units tend to specialize in the crops or livestock best suited to the region, with their finished products being sold for the retail market or for further processing, with farm products being traded around the world.

== Types of farms ==
A farm may be owned and operated by a single individual, family, community, corporation, or a company, may produce one or many types of produce, and can be a holding of any size from a fraction of a hectare to several thousand hectares.

A farm may operate under a monoculture system or with a variety of cereal or arable crops, which may be separate from or combined with raising livestock. Specialist farms are often denoted as such, thus a dairy farm, fish farm, poultry farm or mink farm.

Some farms may not use the word at all, hence vineyard (grapes), orchard (nuts and other fruit), market garden or "truck farm" (vegetables and flowers). Some farms may be denoted by their topographical location, such as a hill farm, while large estates growing cash crops such as cotton or coffee may be called plantations.

Many other terms are used to describe farms to denote their methods of production, as in collective, corporate, intensive, organic or vertical.

Where most of the income is from some other employment, and the farm is an expanded residence, the term hobby farm is common. This will allow sufficient size for recreational use but be very unlikely to produce sufficient income to be self-sustaining. Hobby farms are commonly around 2 hectares (4.9 acres) but may be much larger depending on land prices.

Other farms may primarily exist for research or education, such as an ant farm, and since farming is synonymous with mass production, the word "farm" may be used to describe wind power generation or puppy farm.

Mean and median farm sizes by country income group.

Contribution of different farm sizes to global dietary energy production by crop group

Global share of farms and area operated by farm size

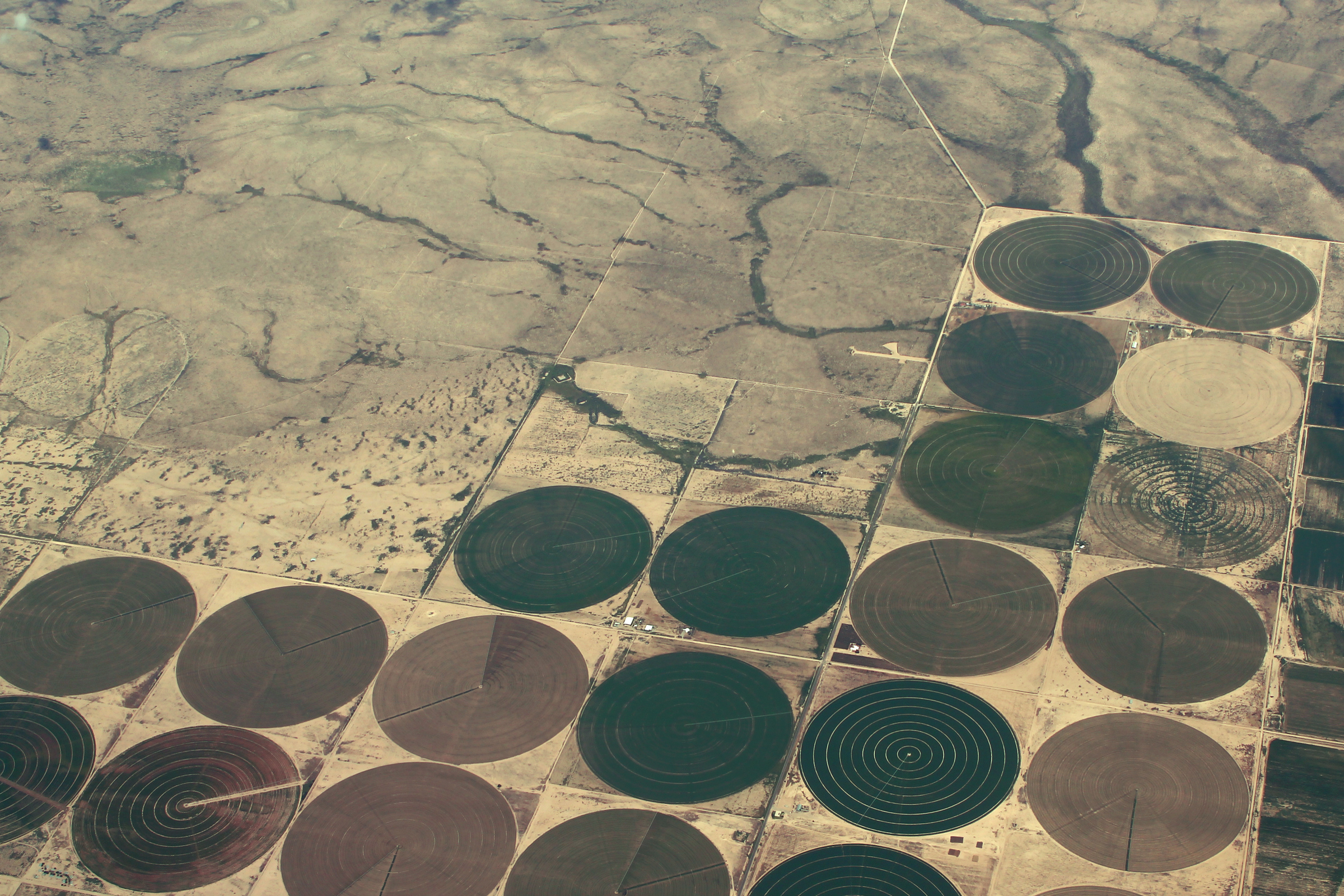
Farmland in the United States. The round fields are due to the use of center pivot irrigation

=== Farm buildings ===
Farms have special buildings. Some buildings, such as barns, may hold animals. There may be separate buildings for chickens and pigs. On dairy farms, a milking parlor is an important building. It is where dairy cows are milked. The milk is kept in a milking parlor until a milk tanker comes to get it. There are also special buildings for keeping grain. A silo is a tall building where grains, such as wheat and oats are stored. Farmers also use small round metal buildings to store their grain. These buildings are called grain bins.

== Specialized farms ==
=== Dairy farm ===
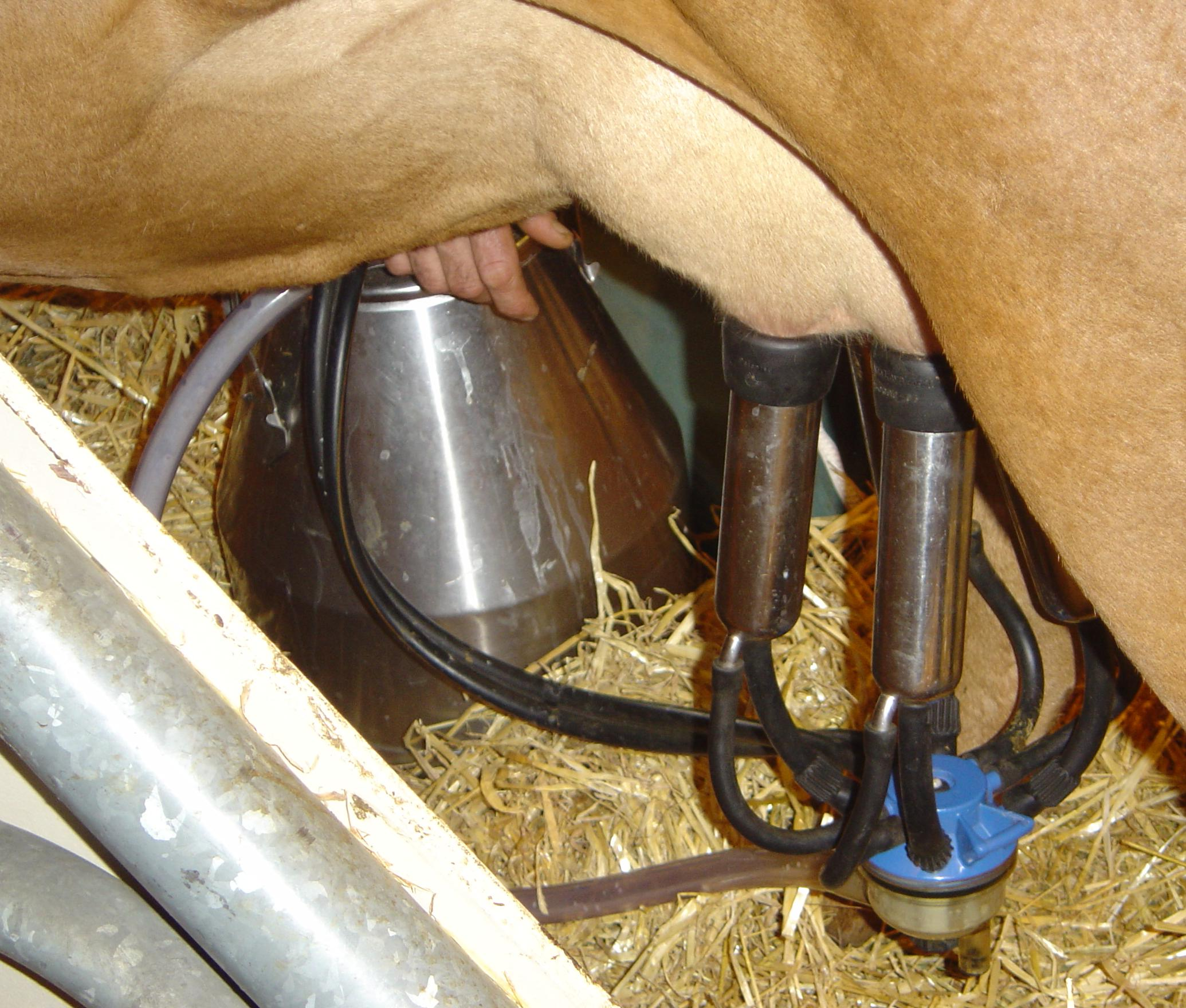
A milking machine in action

Dairy farming is a class of agriculture, where female cattle, goats, or other mammals are raised for their milk, which may be either processed on-site or transported to a dairy for processing and eventual retail sale There are many breeds of cattle that can be milked some of the best producing ones include Holstein, Norwegian Red, Kostroma, Brown Swiss, and more.

In most Western countries, a centralized dairy facility processes milk and dairy products, such as ice cream, yogurt, butter, and cheese. In the United States, these dairies are usually local companies, while in the Southern Hemisphere facilities may be run by very large nationwide or trans-national corporations (such as Fonterra).

Dairy farms generally sell male calves for veal meat, as dairy breeds are not normally satisfactory for commercial beef production. Many dairy farms also grow their own feed, typically including maize, alfalfa, and hay. This is fed directly to the cows, or stored as silage for use during the winter season. Additional dietary supplements are added to the feed to improve milk production.

=== Poultry farm ===
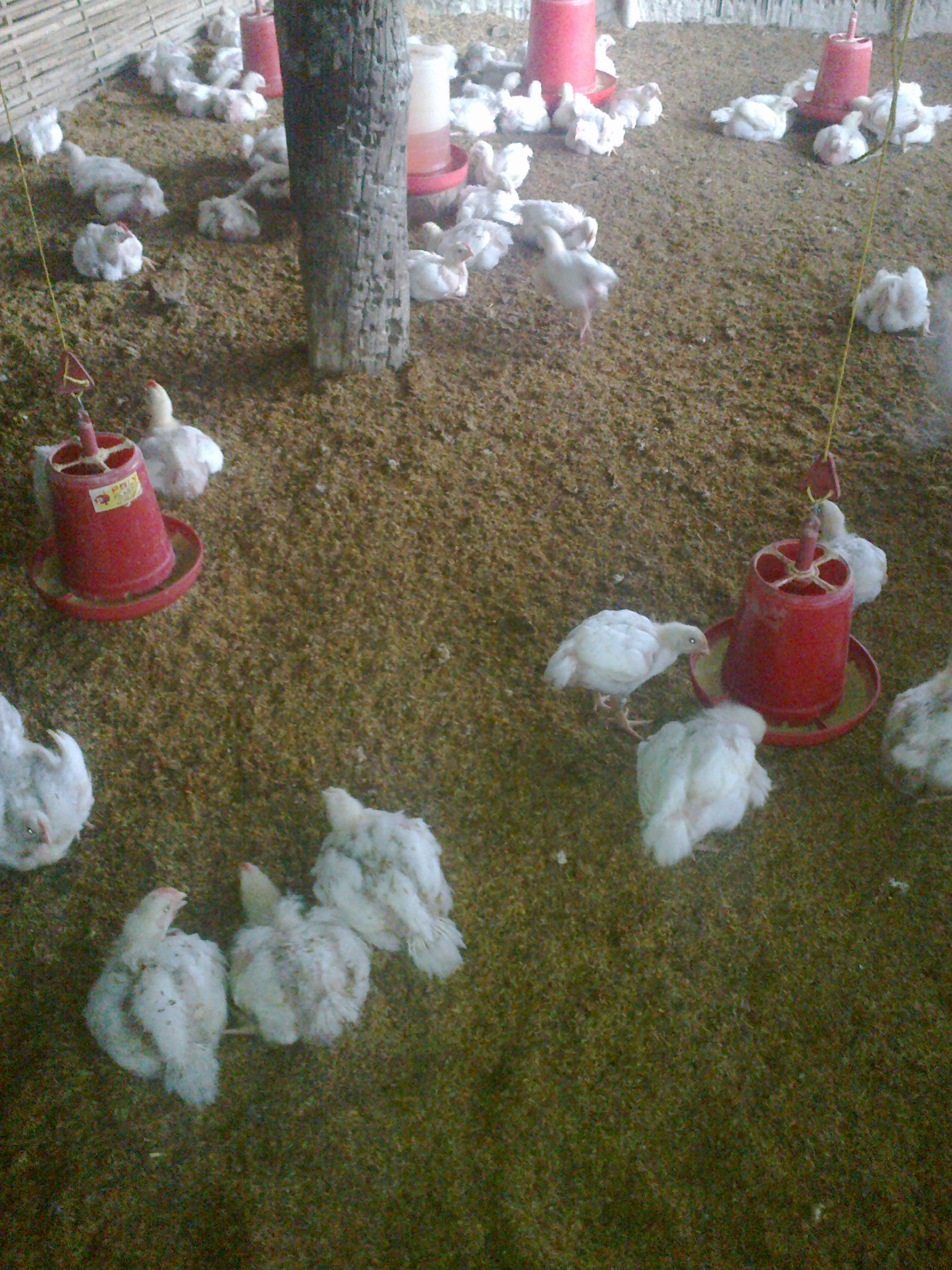
Poultry farming

Poultry farms are devoted to raising chickens (egg layers or broilers), turkeys, ducks, and other fowl, generally for meat or eggs.

=== Pig farm ===
A pig farm is one that specializes in raising pigs for bacon, ham, and other pork products. They may be free range, intensive, or both.

== Ownership ==
Farm control and ownership have traditionally been a key indicator of status and power, especially in Medieval European agrarian societies. The distribution of farm ownership has historically been closely linked to a form of government. Medieval feudalism was essentially a system that centralized control of farmland, control of farm labor, and political power, while the early American democracy, in which land ownership was a prerequisite for voting rights, was built on relatively easy paths to individual farm ownership. However, the gradual modernization and mechanization of farming, which greatly increases both the efficiency and capital requirements of farming, has led to increasingly large farms. This has usually been accompanied by the decoupling of political power from farm ownership.

Of the approximately 570 million farms worldwide in 2025, 85% are smaller than 2 hectares, they cover just 9% of agricultural land. In contrast, farms over 1,000 hectares represent only 0.1% of all farms but manage half of the world's farmland. Despite persistent constraints, nearly 500 million smallholders contribute significantly to global food supply. At the same time, larger farms, particularly those exceeding 50 hectares have a disproportionate influence on land use and food provision, positioning them as key actors in the global response to land degradation. Farm size strongly influences land management and food production strategies, as well as farmers' ability to address land degradation. Medium-sized farms, those between 2 ha and 50 ha – play a particularly important role in Africa and Asia, where they manage about half of all agricultural land. Larger farms often have more resources to invest in advanced technologies that optimize input use and productivity – but which can exacerbate land degradation. However, these farms may also have greater incentives to maintain land quality, if it is clearly linked to long-term profitability. Conversely, smaller farms often contend with more vulnerable land conditions, and struggle with limited resources and multiple market constraints.

Farm size vary widely by region, in 2025 Latin America and the Caribbean had only 3% of farms because holdings are generally large; in Asia and Africa, smallhold farms of 2 to 50 ha worked around half the farmland; and in Europe, the Americas and Oceania, farms exceeding 1 000 ha controlled the greater part of farmland.

The crops produced by small-hold farmers contributed in 2025 approximately 16% of global dietary energy, 12% of proteins, and 9% of fats derived from crops. Their contribution was significant for certain crop types: farms smaller than 5 ha produce almost 50% of global stimulants, spices and aromatic crops, while contributing between 20% - 30% of cereals, fruits and vegetables.

Significant gender inequalities exist in farm ownership in 2025, with women in 43 out of 49 countries with available data less likely than men to own or have secure rights to agricultural land. When women do have secure land rights, they increase investment in soil conservation, have greater crop diversity and improved household food security.

=== Forms of ownership ===
In some societies (especially socialist and communist), collective farming is the norm, with either government ownership of the land or common ownership by a local group. Especially in societies without widespread industrialized farming, tenant farming and sharecropping are common; farmers either pay landowners for the right to use farmland or give up a portion of the crops.

=== Agribusiness ===
Agribusiness is the industry, enterprises, and the field of study of value chains in agriculture and in the bio-economy, in which case it is also called bio-business or bio-enterprise. The primary goal of agribusiness is to maximize profit while satisfying the needs of consumers for products related to natural resources. Agribusinesses comprise farms, food and fiber processing, forestry, fisheries, biotechnology and biofuel enterprises and their input suppliers.

Studies of business growth and performance in farming have found that successful agricultural businesses are cost-efficient internally and operate in favourable economic, political, and physical-organic environments. They are able to expand and make profits, improve the productivity of land, labor, and capital, and keep their costs down to ensure market price competitiveness.

Agribusiness is not limited to farming. It encompasses a broader spectrum through the agribusiness system which includes input supplies, value-addition, marketing, entrepreneurship, microfinancing, and agricultural extension.

In some countries like the Philippines, creation and management of agribusiness enterprises require consultation with registered agriculturists above a certain level of operations, capitalization, land area, or number of animals in the farm.

Low wages for farmworkers have resulted in farmworker shortages.

== Farms around the world ==
Distribution of the world's 571 million farms by region, 2025.

=== United States ===
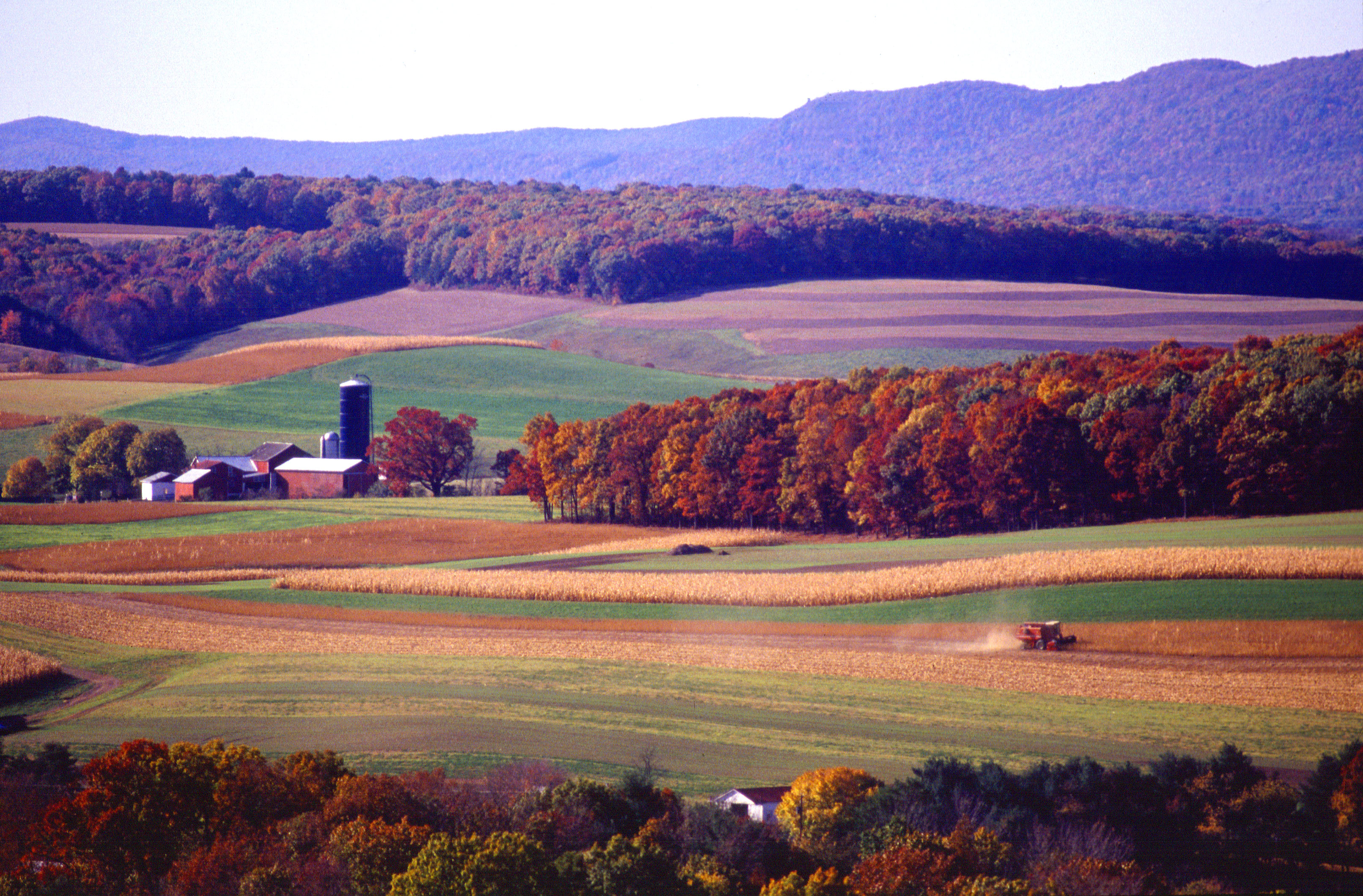
Farming near Klingerstown, Pennsylvania

The land and buildings of a farm are called the "farmstead". Enterprises where livestock are raised on rangeland are called ranches. Where livestock are raised in confinement on feed produced elsewhere, the term feedlot is usually used.

In the US, in 1910 there were 6,406,000 farms and 10,174,000 family workers; In 2000 there were only 2,172,000 farms and 2,062,300 family workers. The share of U.S. farms operated by women has risen steadily over recent decades, from 5 percent in 1978 to 14 percent by 2007.

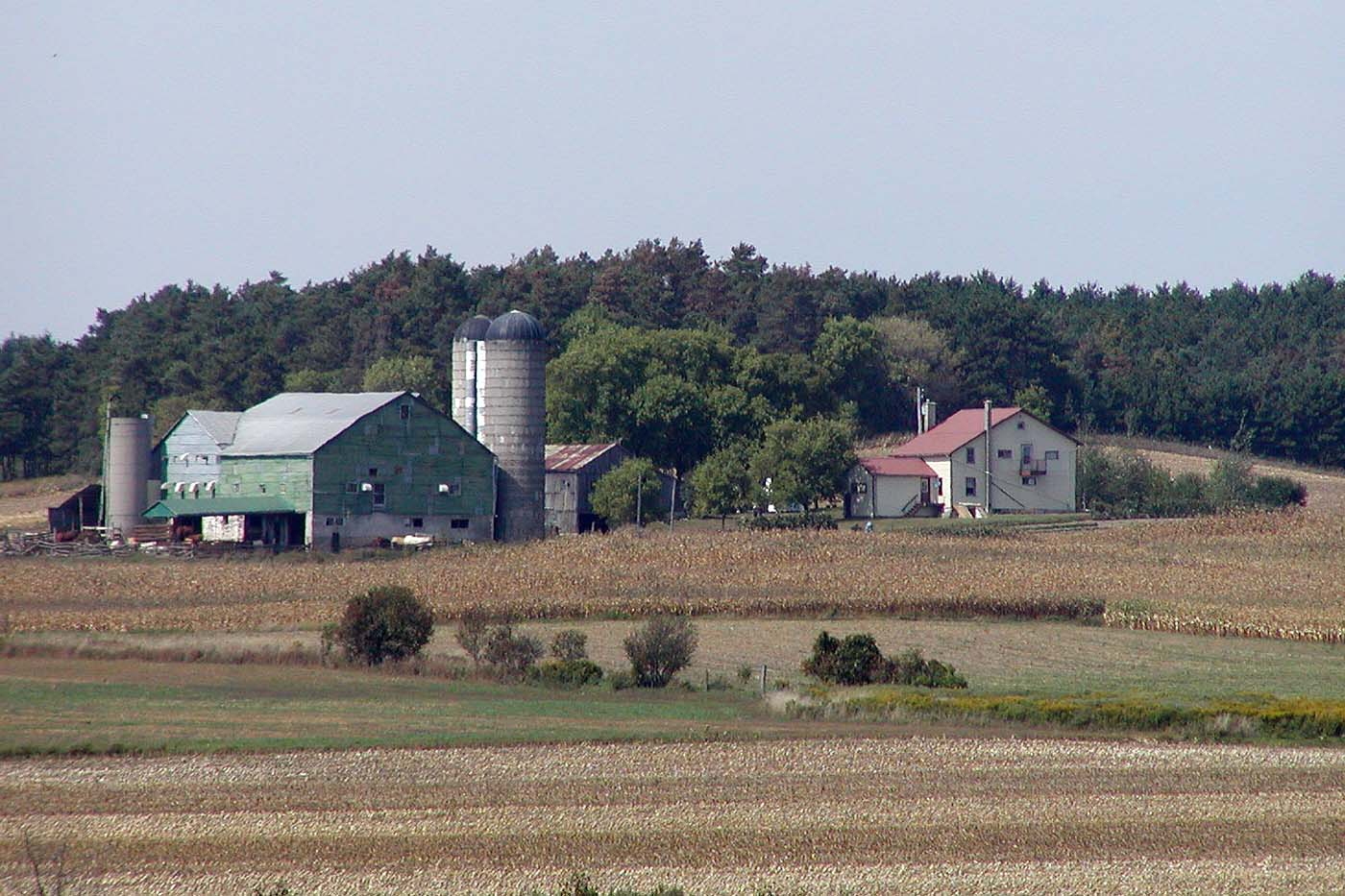
A typical North American grain farm with farmstead in Ontario, Canada

In the United States, there are over three million farmworkers; 72% are foreign-born, 78% are male, they have an average age of 36 and average education of 8 years.

In 2007, corn acres are expected to increase by 15% because of the high demand for ethanol, both in and outside of the U.S. Producers are expecting to plant 90.5 million acres (366,000 km^{2}) of corn, making it the largest corn crop since 1944.

=== Europe ===
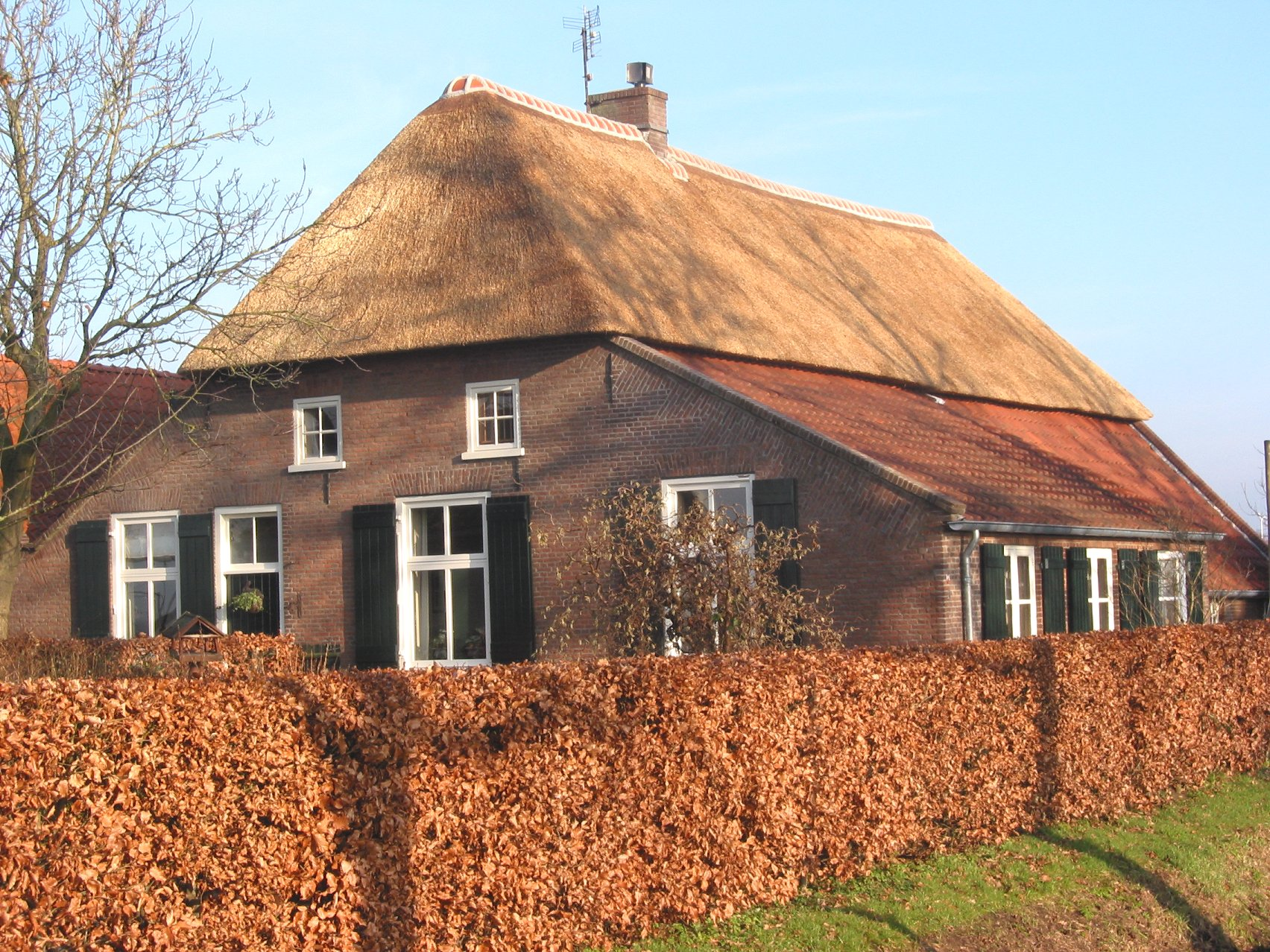
Traditional Dutch farmhouse

In the UK, farm as an agricultural unit, always denotes the area of pasture and other fields together with its farmhouse, farmyard and outbuildings. Large farms, or groups of farms under the same ownership, may be called an estate. Conversely, a small farm surrounding the owner's dwelling is called a smallholding and is generally focused on self-sufficiency with only the surplus being sold.

In Europe, traditional family farms are giving way to larger production units where industrial agriculture and mechanization brings large crop yields.

The Common Agricultural Policy (CAP) is one of the most important policies of the European Union and is helping in the change of farms from traditional family farms to larger production units. The policy has the objectives of increasing agricultural production, providing certainty in food supplies, ensuring a high quality of life for farmers, stabilizing markets, and ensuring reasonable prices for consumers. It was, until recently, operated by a system of subsidies and market intervention. Until the 1990s, the policy accounted for over 60 per cent of the European Union's annual budget, and as of 2013 accounts for around 34 per cent.

=== Asia ===
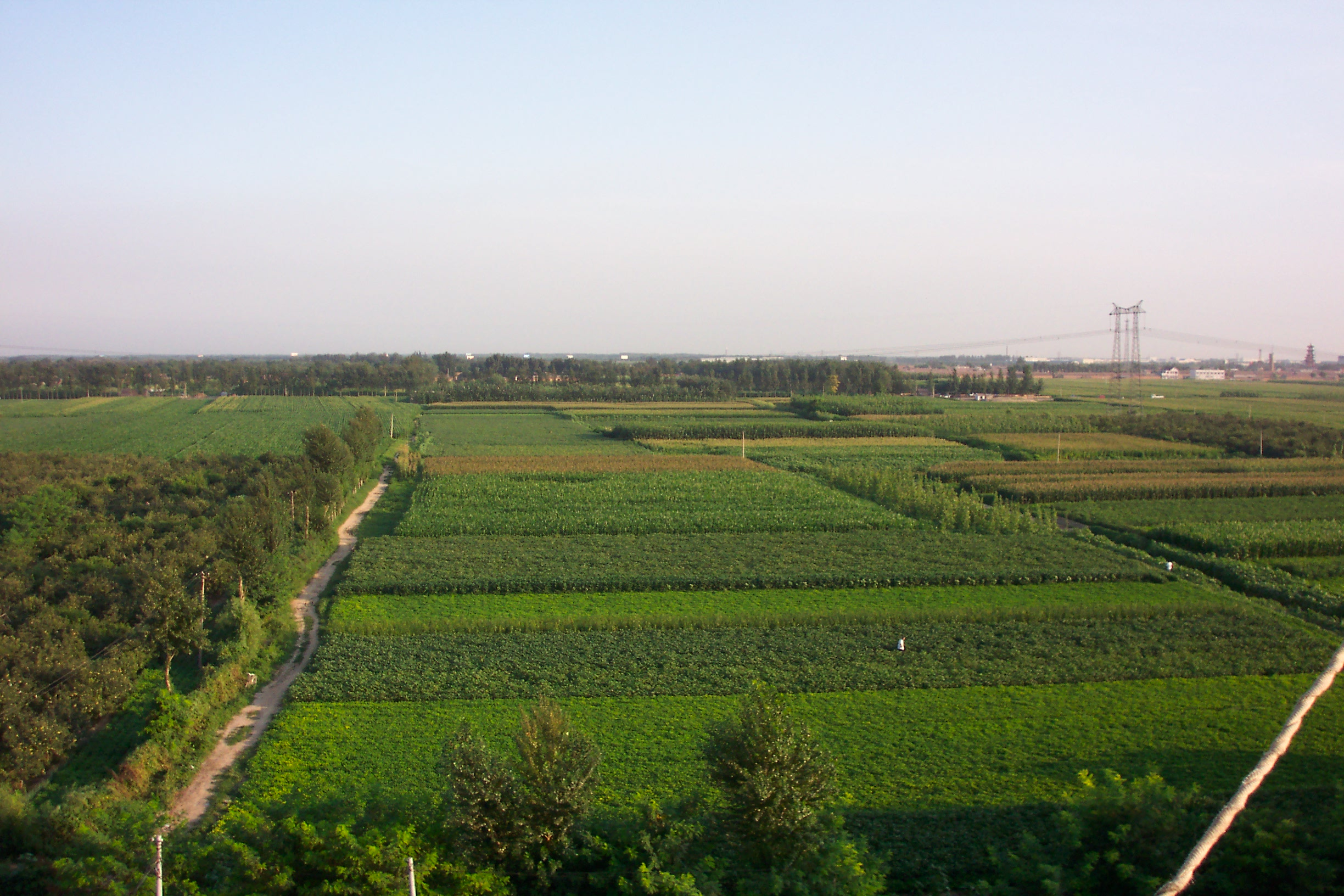
Farmlands in Hebei province, China

==== Pakistan ====
According to the World Bank, "most empirical evidence indicates that land productivity on large farms in Pakistan is lower than that of small farms, holding other factors constant." Small farmers have "higher net returns per hectare" than large farms, according to farm household income data.

==== Nepal ====
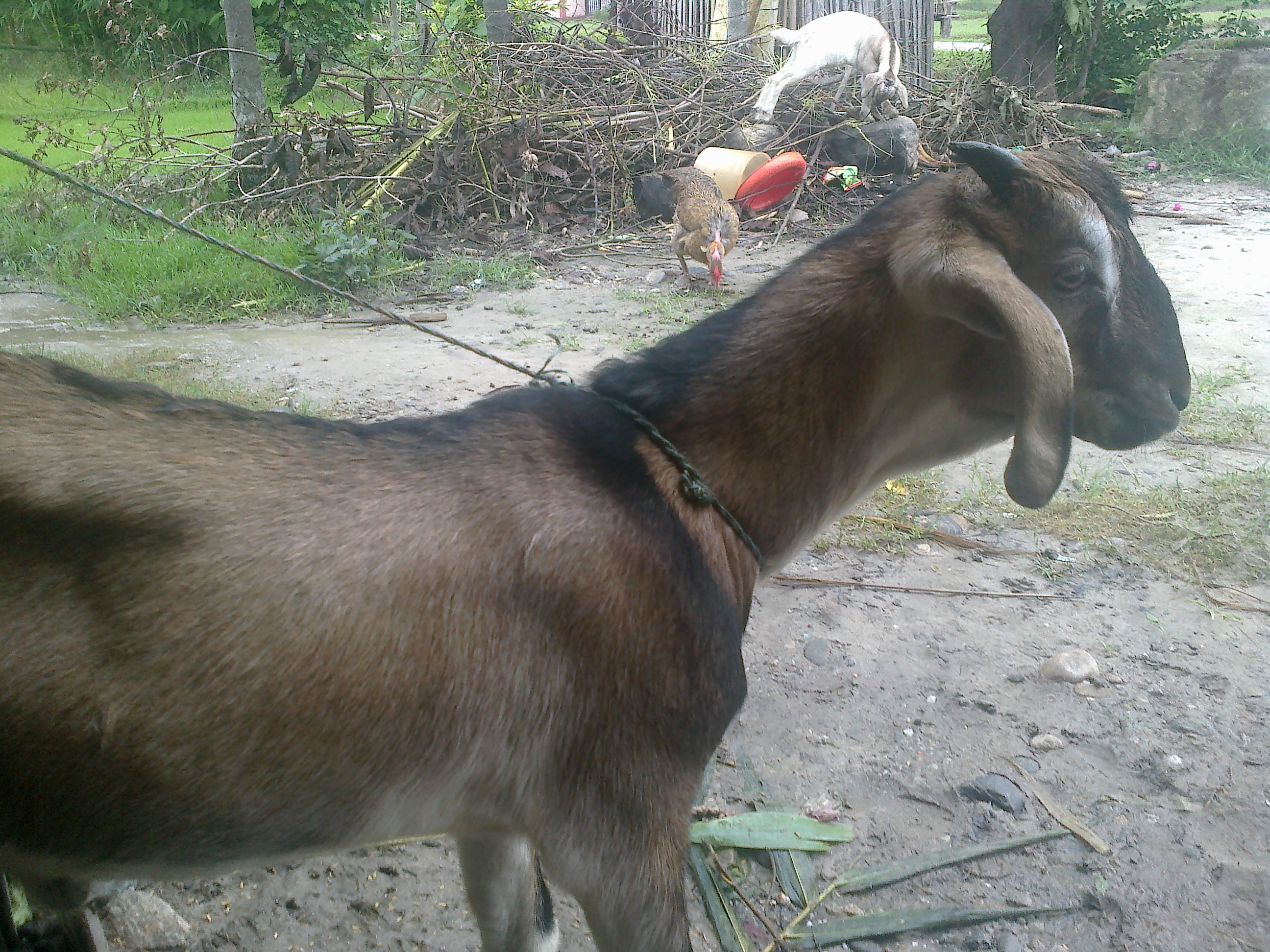
Goat found in Nepal

Nepal is an agricultural country and about 80% of the total population are engaged in farming. Rice is mainly produced in Nepal along with fruits like apples. Dairy farming and poultry farming are also growing in Nepal.

=== Australia ===
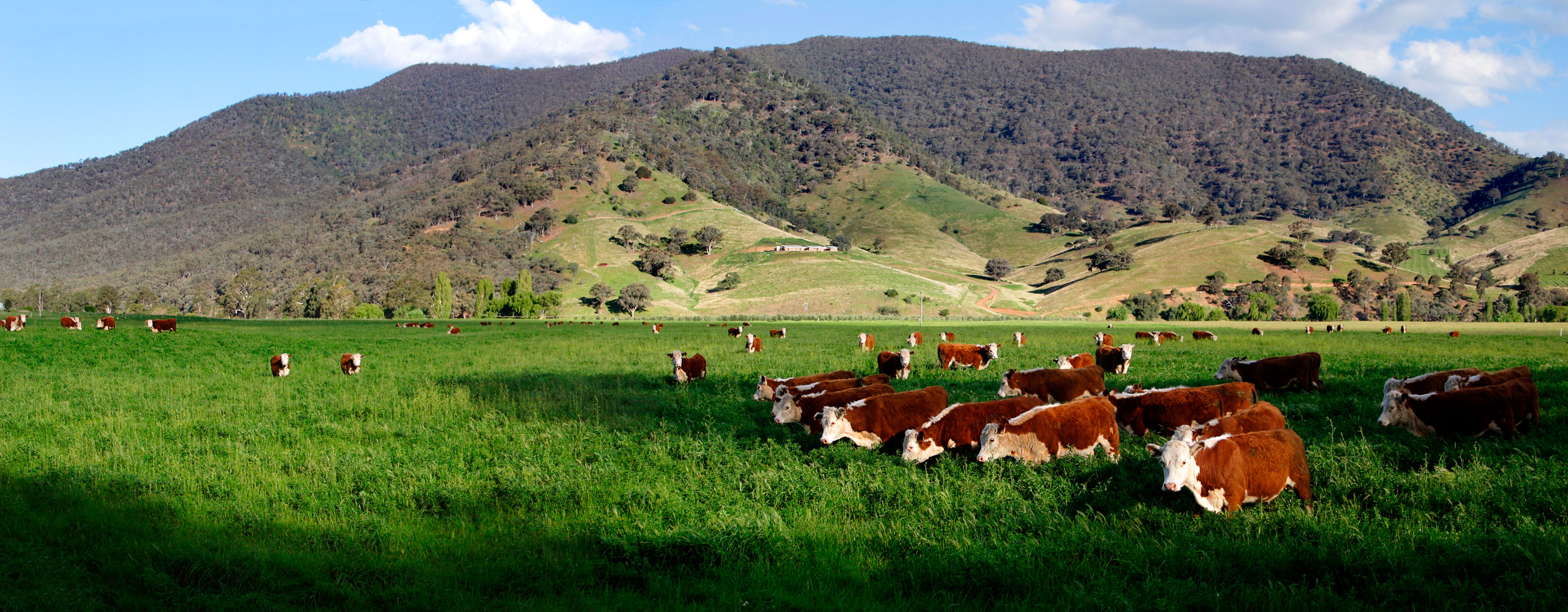
Cattle grazing on a farm in Victoria, Australia

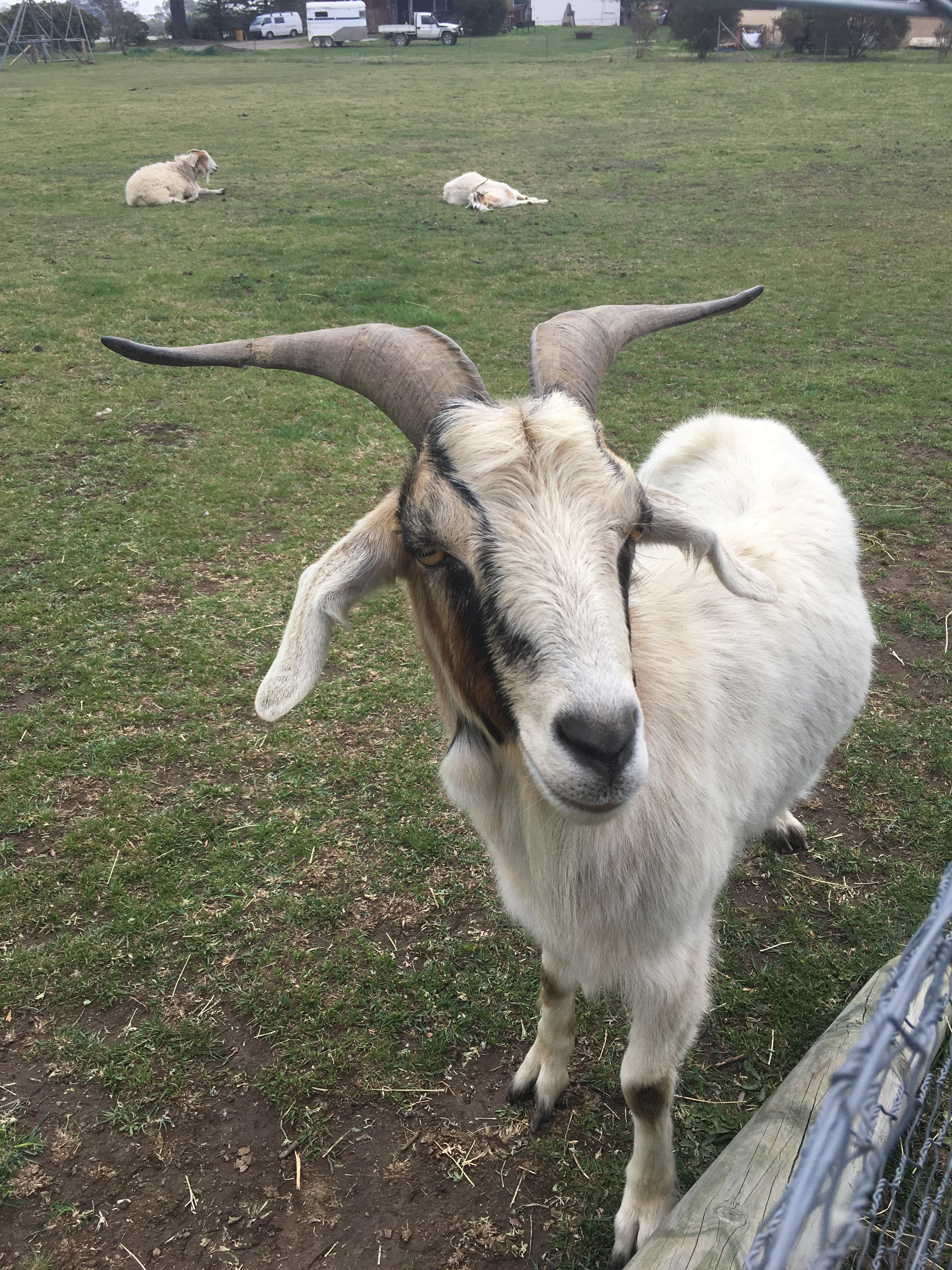
Goat found in Australia

Farming is a significant economic sector in Australia. A farm is an area of land used for primary production which will include buildings.

According to the UN, "green agriculture directs a greater share of total farming input expenditures towards the purchase of locally sourced input?(e.g. labour and organic fertilisers) and a local multiplier effect is expected to kick in. Overall, green farming practices tend to require more labour inputs than conventional farming (e.g. from comparable levels to as much as 30 percent more) (FAO 2007 and European Commission 2010), creating jobs in rural areas and a higher return on labour inputs."

Often very small farms used for intensive primary production are referred to by the specialization they are being used for, such as a dairy rather than a dairy farm, a piggery, a market garden, etc. This also applies to feedlots, which are specifically developed for a single purpose and are often not able to be used for more general purpose (mixed) farming practices.

In remote areas, farms can become quite large. As with estates in England, there is no defined size or method of operation at which a large farm becomes a station.

=== Africa ===
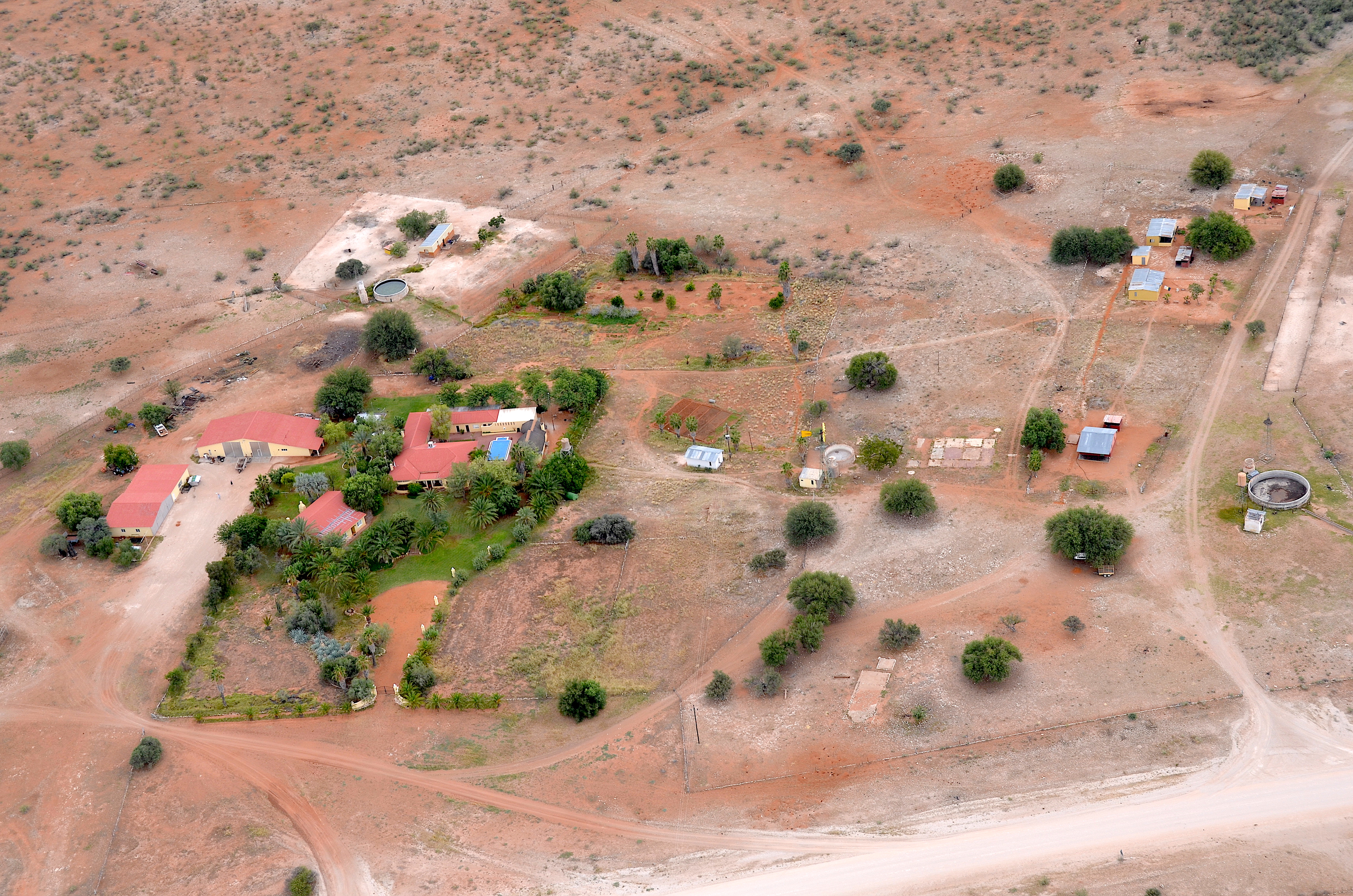
A typical farm in Namibia

A farm in Africa includes various structures. Depending on climate-related areas primarily farming is the raising and breeding of grazing livestock, such as cattle, sheep, ostriches, horses or goats. Predominantly domestic animals are raised for their meat, milk, skin, leather or fiber wool). You might even come across silk farms.

Furthermore, there are plenty of hunting farms, guest farms and game farms. Arable or irrigated land is often used for raising crops such as feed grains and hay for animal feeding.

On some farms (Astro Farm) star-gazing became very popular because of the excellent optical quality in the desert. The High Energy Stereoscopic System (H.E.S.S.) which investigates cosmic gamma rays is situated on Farm Göllschau in Namibia.

== Farm equipment ==
Farm equipment has evolved over the centuries from simple hand tools such as the hoe, through ox- or horse-drawn equipment such as the plough and harrow, to the modern highly technical machinery such as the tractor, baler and combine harvester replacing what was a highly labour-intensive occupation before the Industrial Revolution. Today much of the farm equipment used on both small and large farms is automated (e.g. using satellite guided farming).

As new types of high-tech farm equipment have become inaccessible to farmers that historically fixed their own equipment, Wired magazine reports there is a growing backlash, due mostly to companies using intellectual property law to prevent farmers from having the legal right to fix their equipment (or gain access to the information to allow them to do it). This has encouraged groups such as Open Source Ecology and Farm Hack to begin to make open source hardware for agricultural machinery. In addition on a smaller scale Farmbot and the RepRap open source 3D printer community has begun to make open-source farm tools available of increasing levels of sophistication.

== Sources ==
This article incorporates text from a free content work. Licensed under CC BY 4.0 (license statement/permission). Text taken from The State of Food and Agriculture 2025, Food and Agriculture Organization of the United Nations.

== See also ==
- Agrarian structure
- Agricultural technology
- Agroecology
- Electrical energy efficiency on United States farms
- Factory farming
- Farm management
- Gentleman's farm
- List of organic gardening and farming topics
- Museum of Scottish Country Life
- Prison farm
- Rural economics
- Rural flight

== Bibliography ==
- Adams, Jane H. (July 1988). "The Decoupling of Farm and Household: Differential Consequences of Capitalist Development on Southern Illinois and Third World Family Farms". Comparative Studies in Society and History. 30 (3): 453–482. doi:10.1017/S0010417500015334. S2CID 154381479.
- Blackbourn, David (1998). The Long Nineteenth Century: A History of Germany, 1780–1918. New York: Oxford University Press.
- Clark, Christopher (2006). Iron Kingdom: The Rise and Downfall of Prussia, 1600–1947. Cambridge, Massachusetts: The Belknap Press of Harvard University Press.
- Gregor, Howard F. (July 1969). "Farm Structure in Regional Comparison: California and New Jersey Vegetable Farms". Economic Geography. 45 (3): 209–225. doi:10.2307/143091. JSTOR 143091.
- Grigg, David (July 1966). "The Geography of Farm Size a Preliminary Survey". Economic Geography. 42 (3): 205–235. doi:10.2307/142007. JSTOR 142007.
- Schmidt, Elizabeth (1992). Peasants, Traders, and Wives: Shona Women in the History of Zimbabwe, 1870–1939. Portsmouth, New Hampshire: Heinemann.
