= Farmers' Party =

Farmers' Party may refer to:

- Farmers' Party (Greece), a political party in Greece in the 1920s and 1930s
- Farmers' Party (Iceland, 1913), a political party in Iceland between 1913 and 1916
- Farmers' Party (Iceland, 1933), a political party in Iceland between 1933 and 1942
- Farmers' Party (Ireland), an agrarian political party in the Irish Free State between 1922 and 1932
- Farmers' Party (Jamaica), a political party in Jamaica
- Japan Farmers Party (1926–28), a political party in Japan between 1926 and 1928
- Japan Farmers Party (1947–49), a political party in Japan
- Farmers' Party (Lithuania), a liberal political party in inter-war Lithuania
- Farmers' Party (Netherlands), a Dutch agrarian political party
- Luzon Farmers Party (Philippines)

== See also ==
- Latvian Farmers' Union
- Peasant Party (Taiwan)
- Shooters, Fishers and Farmers Party, an Australian party
- Agrarian Party (disambiguation)
- United Farmers (disambiguation)
