= Green Movement of Sri Lanka =

The Green Movement of Sri Lanka is a consortium of 147 non-governmental organizations with a common goal of increasing environmental awareness and furthering conservation efforts in Sri Lanka. The movement provides environmental education resources, and also uses legal avenues and political pressure tactics such as lobbying to achieve their aims. Another aim is sustainable development.
