= Democratic Peasants' Party =

Democratic Peasants' Party may refer to:

- Democratic Peasants' Party (Bukovina)
- Democratic Peasants' Party–Lupu
- Democratic Peasants' Party–Stere

== See also ==
- Democratic Farmers' Party of Germany
