= The Journal of Peasant Studies =

- Discipline: Development studies, anthropology
- Language: English
- Edited by: Shaila Seshia Galvin, Jacobo Grajales, Ye Jingzhong, Ruth Hall, Kasia Paprocki, Sergio Sauer, Annie Shattuck

Publication details
- History: 1973–present
- Publisher: Routledge
- Frequency: Bimonthly
- Impact factor: 5.0 (2024)

Standard abbreviations
- ISO 4: J. Peasant Stud.

Indexing
- ISSN: 0306-6150 (print); 1743-9361 (web)
- LCCN: 75642680
- OCLC no.: 884525567

Links
- Journal homepage; Online access; Online archive

The Journal of Peasant Studies, subtitled Critical Perspectives on Rural Politics and Development, is a bimonthly peer-reviewed academic journal covering research into the social structures, institutions, actors, and processes of change in the rural areas of the developing world. It is published by Routledge.

== Abstracting and indexing ==
The journal is abstracted and indexed in Current Contents/Social & Behavioural Sciences, International Bibliography of the Social Sciences, International Political Science Abstracts, Scopus, the Social Sciences Citation Index, and Sociological Abstracts. According to the Journal Citation Reports, the journal has a 2013 impact factor of 5.477, ranking it first out of 81 journals in the category "Anthropology" and first out of 55 journals in the category "Planning and Development".

== History ==
The journal was an outgrowth of a 1972 University of London seminar on peasantries. It was established in 1973 with Terence J. Byres (1973–2000), Charles Curwen (1973–1984), and Teodor Shanin (1973–1975) as founding editors-in-chief. Other past editors of the journal have been Henry Bernstein (1985–2000), Tom Brass (1990–1998, 2000–2008), and Saturnino "Jun" Borras, Jr. (2008-2023). The current editors are Shaila Seshia Galvin, Jacobo Grajales, Ye Jingzhong, Ruth Hall, Kasia Paprocki, Sergio Sauer, Annie Shattuck.

== See also ==
Journal of Agrarian Change
