= Agrarian National Party =

Peruvian political party

Agrarian National Party Partido Nacional Agrario
- Abbreviation: PNA
- Founders: Pedro Beltrán Espantoso; Gerardo Klinge; Manuel González Olaechea
- Founded: 1930
- Ideology: Liberalism (Peruvian); Conservatism (Peruvian)

Agrarian National Party (in Spanish: Partido Nacional Agrario) was a political party in Peru. It was founded in 1930 by Pedro Beltrán Espantoso, Gerardo Klinge and Manuel González Olaechea.
