= Gebhard Gerner =

Liechtenstein politician (1902–1991)

Member of the Landtag of Liechtenstein for Oberland
- In office 23 February 1950 – 15 February 1953
- Preceded by: Heinrich Andreas Brunhart

Personal details
- Born: 27 August 1902 Eschen, Liechtenstein
- Died: 17 January 1991 (aged 88) Eschen, Liechtenstein
- Party: Patriotic Union
- Spouse: Theresia Gerner (m. 1936)
- Children: 3

Gebhard Gerner (27 August 1902 – 17 January 1991) was a politician from Liechtenstein who served in the Landtag of Liechtenstein from 1953 to 1957.

He worked as a bricklayer and farmer and he worked on the construction of the Liechtenstein inland canal. Gerner was generally considered a worker's representative in Liechtenstein. He was a deputy member of the Landtag from 1957 to 1958.

== Bibliography ==
- Vogt, Paul (1987). 125 Jahre Landtag (in German). Vaduz: Landtag of the Principality of Liechtenstein.
