= Journal of Agrarian Change =

- Discipline: Agrarian political economy
- Language: English

Publication details
- History: 2001-present
- Publisher: John Wiley & Sons
- Frequency: Quarterly
- Impact factor: 4.1 (2025)

Standard abbreviations
- ISO 4: J. Agrar. Change

Indexing
- ISSN: 1471-0358 (print); 1471-0366 (web)
- LCCN: 2001234171
- OCLC no.: 48204300

Links
- Journal homepage; Online access; Online archive

The Journal of Agrarian Change is a peer-reviewed academic journal established in 2001 covering agrarian political economy. It publishes historical and contemporary studies of the social relations and dynamics of production, power relations in agrarian formations and ownership structures and their processes of change. The journal has a companion website called Agrarian Questions, which publishes blogs and news relevant to its wider community of readership.

The journal was founded by Henry Bernstein and Terry Byres, former editors of the Journal of Peasant Studies. In the introductory issue of the Journal of Agrarian Change, Bernstein and Byres expressed a desire that the new journal would have more coverage of historical and comparative debates, feminist scholarship, analysis of migration and rural labor markets, social differentiation and class formation from a wider set of regions and agrarian formations.

Since its establishment, the journal has covered various debates, including farm-size and productivity, land reform, paths of capitalist transition, the politics of transnational agrarian social movements, the environmental contradictions of capitalist agriculture, global value chain analysis and commodity certification schemes, the agrarian roots of violence and conflict, and migration and rural labour markets. The journal has also published special issues and symposia on various themes in the field of agrarian studies, including the social reproduction of agrarian change, land and labor in Indonesia, and agrarian sustainability in China. In 2025, the journal celebrated its 25th year with a series of forums discussing key issues in the field.

== Abstracting and indexing ==
The Journal of Agrarian Change is abstracted and indexed in Academic Search Premier, AGRICOLA, CABDirect, CSA Biological Sciences Database, CSA Environmental Sciences & Pollution Management Database, Current Contents/Social & Behavioral Sciences, Ecology Abstracts, EMBiology, GEOBASE/Geographical & Geological Abstracts, ProQuest, Social Sciences Citation Index, SocINDEX, Sociological Abstracts, Soils and Fertilizer Abstracts, and Worldwide Political Sciences Abstracts.

According to the Journal Citation Reports, in 2025 the journal had an impact factor of 4.1 and ranked 11 out 66 in development studies and 77 out of 626 in economics.
