= Tom Brass =

British academic, lecturer, and editor

Tom Brass is an academic who has written widely on peasant studies. For many years he was at the University of Cambridge as an affiliated lecturer in their Faculty of Social and Political Sciences and at Queens' College, Cambridge as their Director of Studies of the Social and Political Sciences. For many years he was an, and then the, editor of the Journal of Peasant Studies. Murray reports Brass as being "dismissive of the cultural turn in peasant studies" and the rise of post-modern perspectives and his notion that this has been a conservative process and that it has lent support to neoliberalism.

== Biography ==
Born on 3 March 1946, Tom (Thomas Ferdinand Norman) Brass was educated at boarding schools run by the Dominicans (Blackfriars, Llanarth and Laxton), studied social sciences (sociology, anthropology) at the new universities (Essex, Sussex) and then taught these same subjects at the old ones (Durham, Cambridge). He conducted fieldwork research in eastern Peru during the mid-1970s and in Northern India during the 1980s. An account by him of his arrest, interrogation, imprisonment and expulsion from Peru is contained in ‘The Sabotage of Anthropology and the Anthropologist as Saboteur’, The Journal of the Anthropological Society of Oxford, Vol. XIII, No. 2 (1982). (Reprinted together with a postscript in Labour Markets, Identities, Controversies, pages 181–191). His mother was the girlfriend of John Cairncross when the latter was spying for Russia in 1937, and recently discovered letters from Cairncross to her are published in Histories (2026), pages 199-202, 219.

== Work ==
Described by James Petras (Science and Society, Vol. 77, No. 3, 2013, p. 434) as ‘one of the United Kingdom’s leading Marxist scholars’, much of what Brass has published deals with two contentious and much-debated issues in the area of development studies: the link between unfree labour and capitalism, and the political impact of the ‘new’ populist postmodernism. His views have influenced others writing about these same issues.

First, he challenged the prevailing orthodoxy that capitalist transformation of the agrarian sector automatically leads to the replacement of unfree workers with free equivalents. Where a worker is unable to sell his/her own labour-power, such a person is not free, and thus according to political economy not part of a proletariat. This is regardless of employment duration, whether s/he receives a wage, is a local or a migrant, or has access to land. In their conflict with rural labour, employers reproduce, introduce or reintroduce unfree relations, a process of workforce decomposition/recomposition Brass calls deproletarianisation. Its object is to discipline and cheapen labour-power, an economic advantage in a global context where agricultural producers have to become increasingly cost-conscious to remain competitive.

And second, he has challenged the prevailing view that the ‘cultural turn’ is a politically progressive contribution to development studies. According to Brass, the ‘new’ populist postmodernism recuperated a specifically cultural dimension of ‘peasant-ness’, a discourse associated most powerfully with the Subaltern Studies project, formulated initially in the context of Asian historiography and latterly with regard to Latin American history. For the ‘new’ populist postmodernism this analytical re-essentialization of peasant did two things. It rejected Enlightenment discourse as an inauthentic Eurocentric colonial imposition, thereby recovering a hitherto unheard grassroots voice that was authentically nationalist.

For this reason, postmodern interpretations of agrarian mobilisations in Latin America and India nowadays insist that these are ‘new’ social movements, the defining characteristic of which is the non-class identity (religion, ethnicity, gender, regionalism, nationalism) deployed by their participants. Consequently, postmodernists claim, such mobilisations are antagonistic to socialism, unconnected with fundamental changes in production relations, and thus incompatible with revolutionary transformation. What is at stake, Brass argues, is not just the form to be taken by economic growth in rural areas of the so-called Third World, but the very fact of development itself.

== Selected publications ==
- Brass, Tom (2026) "Ranajit Guha and The Journal of Peasant Studies: An Enduring Legacy", in Sourav Chattopadhyay (ed.), Ranajit Guha (1923-2023) A Centenary Collection by Bhabuk Sabha, Kolkata: Alochona Chakra.
- Brass, Tom (2026) "Is Marx at Home in Ancient Rome, or Is the Eternal City the Locus of an Eternal Capitalism?" (Chapter 3), in R. Das, R. Latham, & D. Fasenfest (eds.), The Power of Marxist Thought - Volume 1, Leiden: Brill.
- Brass, Tom (2026) Histories: Ancient, Modern, Personal and Political, Leiden: Brill.
- Brass, Tom (2024) Critiques: In Defence of Development, Leiden: Brill.
- Brass, Tom (2024) "A Vanishing Army? Redefining the Industrial Reserve" (Chapter 12), and "On the Continuing Necessity of (Marxist) Critique" (Chapter 15), in T. Brass & R.J. Das (eds.), Interrogating the Future: Essays in Honour of David Fasenfest, Leiden: Brill.
- Brass, Tom (2022) Transitions: Methods, Theory, Politics, Leiden: Brill.
- Brass, Tom (2022) “Great Replacement and/as the Industrial Reserve: Populism or Marxism?” (Chapter 7), and “Marxism, Peasants, and the Cultural Turn: The Myth of a ‘Nice’ Populism” (Chapter 13), in D. Fasenfest (ed.), Marx Matters, Leiden: Brill.
- Brass, Tom (2021) Marxism Missing, Missing Marxism, Leiden: Brill.
- Brass, Tom (2019) Revolution and Its Alternatives: Other Marxisms, Other Empowerments, Other Priorities, Leiden: Brill.
- Brass, Tom (2017) Labour Markets, Identities, Controversies: Reviews and Essays, 1982-2016, Leiden: Brill.
- Brass, Tom (2014) Class, Culture and the Agrarian Myth, Leiden: Brill.
- Brass, Tom (2011) Labour Regime Change in the Twenty-First Century: Unfreedom, Capitalism and Primitive Accumulation, Leiden: Brill.
- Brass, Tom (2010) "Capitalism, Primitive Accumulation and Unfree Labour", pp. 67–149 in H. Veltmeyer (ed.), Imperialism, Crisis and Class Struggle: The Enduring Verities of Capitalism – Essays Presented to James Petras, Leiden: Brill.
- Brass, Tom (2007) "Neoliberalism and the Rise of (Peasant) Nations within the Nation: Chiapas in Comparative and Theoretical Perspective", pp. 235–275 in Sarah Washbrook (ed.), Rural Chiapas ten years after the Zapatista Uprising, London and New York: Routledge.
- Brass, Tom (2007) ‘“A World Which is Not Yet”: Peasants, Civil Society and the State’, pp. 582–664 in Raju Das (ed.), "Peasant, State and Class", a special issue of The Journal of Peasant Studies, Vol. 34, Nos. 3&4.
- Brass, Tom (2003) Latin American Peasants, London; Frank Cass
- Brass, Tom (2000) Peasants, Populism, and Postmodernism: The Return of the Agrarian Myth, London; Frank Cass
- Brass, Tom (2000) ‘Moral Economists, Subalterns, New Social Movements and the (Re-) Emergence of a (Post-) Modernized (Middle) Peasant’, pp. 127–162 in Vinayak Chaturvedi (ed.), Mapping Subaltern Studies and the Postcolonial, London: Verso (article first published in 1991 in The Journal of Peasant Studies).
- Brass, Tom (1999) Towards a Comparative Political Economy of Unfree Labour. Case Studies and Debates, The Library of Peasant Studies, 16. Frank Cass, London
- Brass, Tom and Marcel van der Linden (eds) (1997) Free and Unfree Labour. The Debate Continues, International and Comparative Social History, 5., Peter Lang, Bern
- Brass, Tom (1995) New Farmers' Movements in India, London: Frank Cass
