= Agrarian League =

Agrarian League may refer to:

- The general concept of Agrarianism
- The German Agrarian League (Bund der Landwirte), political action group, active 1893–1921
- The Agrarian League (Finland), political party 1906–1965 when it became the Center Party
- The Agrarian League (Romania) (Liga Agrară), political party in Romanian general election, 1932, active 1929-1938
- Peasant organization of Pabna District involved in the Indigo revolt in Bengal, 1859

== See also ==
- Agricultural League (Landbund), German political party 1920–1933
- Category:Agrarian parties
