= Electrical energy efficiency on United States farms =

Electrical energy efficiency on United States farms covers the use of electricity on farms and the methods and incentives for improving the efficiency of that use.

U.S. farms have almost doubled their average energy efficiency over the past 25 years.

== Usage ==
Energy costs represent between 2% (at cattle feed lots) and 9% (for grain farming, due partly to grain drying) of farm production costs.

=== Use on dairy farms ===
In 2006 there were about 65,000 dairy farms in the United States, although most had fewer than 200 cows. One "resource auditor" believes it is possible for dairy farms to reach an energy usage of as low as 200 kWhr per cow per year although an analysis of California dairy farms found that 300 kWhr/year was the lowest actually attained.

One study found the following electrical usages on New York dairy farms:

- Milk cooling – 23%
- Ventilation – 21%
- Vacuum pumps – 18%
- Lighting – 17%
- Electrical water heating – 10%
- Feeding equipment – 7%

Another study found highly similar results.

== Regulations ==
Hitherto almost entirely unregulated (except for zoning ordinances and the effects of property taxes), environmental concerns are now beginning to impose restrictions on farms.

How renewable energy projects may be implemented and also on what rate of return electricity producers can obtain from utilities are key current topics. Acts such as Wisconsin's Clean Energy Jobs Act (only proposed as of April, 2010) are controversial among farmers for these reasons. Canada's Green Energy Act 2009 implemented similar kinds of regulations.

Contrarily, carbon offsets may soon offer farmers additional incentives to increase energy use efficiency. However, at least one proposed cap and trade process would raise farmers' costs by up to $1.19 (USD) per acre.

Corporate Average Fuel Economy Fuel standards too (such as in the Energy Independence and Security Act of 2007) are controversial, as biofuels are now a significant portion of farm income.

== Efficiency increases ==
Increased efficiency in farm usage of electricity is being driven by Greening as well as by economics.

"The biggest users of electrical power are heat, light and motors. ... A recent study found that a 3-hp energy efficient compressor used over 42 percent fewer kilowatt-hours (kWhr) than a 3-hp conventional compressor."

Two prime areas for efficiency improvements are implementing the use of heat recovery systems and variable speed drives. One organization postulated a three-year plan for farms to use energy better.

=== Crop rotation ===
Simply including years of either clover or alfalfa into the cycle of grain crops can yield savings without reducing total crop yields.

=== Farm energy audits ===
Farms sometimes use accredited "resource auditors" to analyze their operations and recommend improved efficiencies, typically at costs exceeding $1,000 per audit. However, typical full repayment of an audit's cost could be around six years. Also, a Certified Farm Energy Audit may be required for participation in state or federal energy efficiency programs.

An audit of 20 farms in Cumbria showed savings could be made in all areas examined.

An example of a farm energy audit in Maine is at the following reference. Maryland has a statewide program entitled EnSave.

=== Energy calculators ===
Recently a number of "energy calculators" have become available, addressing one or more aspects of farm energy usage. New calculators are being developed under government and utility grants, such as one in Oregon.

=== Dairy farm efficiency improvements ===
Some improvements are specific to dairy farms, such as using supplemental lighting with energy efficient lamps (which can increase milk production 5 to 16 percent) or relieving heat stress with a combination of sprinklers and fans to increase the cooling effect and improve energy use. California compiled a "Complete Guide" to dairy farm efficiency improvements.

=== Cow manure to electrical generation ===
Norswiss Farms of Rice Lake, Wisconsin, an 1100-cow dairy farm, expects to save over $70,000 per year (plus income from electricity sales) from its installation of an 848 kW Combined Heat and Power (CHP) system operating on anaerobic digesters gas from cow manure. The electricity generated is sold to the grid. A similar installation in 2004 on a 270 cow farm in California (one of five in the state at that time) powered a 75 kW generator.

Central Vermont Public Service has a "Cow Power" program using methane-fueled electricity from Vermont farms.

=== Government and utility incentives ===
U.S. utilities allocated $5.3 billion to energy efficiency programs in 2009.

Government and utility incentives can be beneficial to those entities as well. "It may be less expensive for governments to encourage efficiency and renewable energy options [in order to] delay or negate the need to upgrade and modernize rural grid infrastructure."

A partial list of incentives is available at the following reference: A link to relevant utility pages is at: A third partial list is at:

Alliant Energy in Wisconsin funds the installation of energy-saving projects, receiving payments on the monthly electric bills. National Grid has a similar program.

== See also ==
- Agriculture § Energy and agriculture
- Energy efficiency in agriculture
- Feed-in tariff
- Good Agricultural Practice
- List of sustainable agriculture topics
- National Institute of Food and Agriculture
- Timeline of agriculture and food technology
- Post-harvest losses (Fruit and vegetables)
- Post-harvest losses (Grains)
- Agricultural & Applied Economics Association
- American Journal of Agricultural Economics
- Rural economics
- Energy conservation
- Outline of energy
- Sustainable energy
