= United Farmers =

United Farmers may refer to:

- The United Farmers' MPs in the Canadian House of Commons who founded the Progressive Party of Canada in 1920
- United Farmers of Alberta, a political party which governed Alberta from 1921 to 1935 and also elected members nationally, and which remains in existence as a farmers' organization
- United Farmers of British Columbia, ran two candidates in the 1920 provincial election and helped form the Provincial Party of British Columbia
- United Farmers of Canada, a Saskatchewan-based farmers' union formed in 1926
- United Farmers of Manitoba, a farmers' organization and political party which won the 1922 provincial election and became the Progressive Party of Manitoba
- United Farmers of New Brunswick, a political party
- United Farmers of Nova Scotia, a political party
- United Farmers of Ontario, a political party which governed Ontario from 1919 to 1923 and also elected members nationally
- United Farmers of Quebec (Fermiers unis du Québec), which became the Parti fermier-progressiste du Québec (Progressive Farmers of Quebec) political party
- United Farmers of Saskatchewan, a political party
- Samyukt Kisan Morcha (lit. 'United Farmers Front'), a farmers' union in India

== See also ==
- United Farm Workers
- Farmers' Party (disambiguation)
