= Green Movement in India =

Political movement

The Green Movement in India is an emerging movement that stresses environmentally friendly practices and initiatives in transport, construction, law and more.

== Green buildings ==
India has a history of bioclimatic architecture. From a courtyard Haveli in Rajasthan that stores the cool air from the night before to Charles Correa's contemporary examples of high-rise courtyards in the Kanchanjunga apartments, Mumbai

Today, Indian cities offer a more dense lifestyle with homes and offices surrounded by urban heat islands with dust, noise, and pollution. The design of simple, low-energy bioclimatic strategies and better building materials can shelter from the outside world, creating havens of comfort for occupants of all income levels. This defies assumptions that green design belongs to the affluent. The World Bank has launched Excellence in Design for Greater Efficiencies a program to provide a solution for the EDGE green building program and certification system.

The Confederation of Indian Industry (CII) plays an active role in promoting sustainability in the Indian construction sector. The CII is the central pillar of the Indian Green Building Council (IGBC). The IGBC has licensed the LEED Green Building Standard from the U.S. Green Building Council and is currently responsible for certifying LEED-New Construction and LEED-Core and Shell buildings in India.
