= Henry Bernstein (sociologist) =

British agrarian sociologist (born 1945)

Henry Bernstein (born 9 February 1945) is a British sociologist and emeritus Professor of Development Studies at the University of London's School of Oriental and African Studies.

Bernstein's research includes the political economy of agrarian change; social theory and globalisation and labour. He is known for applying class analysis and Marxist approaches to agrarian societies, including his theories of 'reproduction squeeze'.

From 1985 to 2000 he was co-editor with Terry Byres of the Journal of Peasant Studies, and then became a founding editor, again with Byres, of the Journal of Agrarian Change from 2001 to 2008.

== Early life and education ==
Bernstein was from a working class, Jewish, communist family in Stoke Newington that subsequently lived on a London County Council housing estate near Reigate, where he attended grammar school. He studied history at the University of Cambridge, and sociology at the London School of Economics. With Renee he had two sons.

== Career ==
In the late 1960s, he was a research associate at the Institute of Development Studies, University of Sussex and later a lecturer in interdisciplinary studies at the University of Kent. He spent a year at the Middle East Technical University in Ankara, when Turkey was under military rule. For four years he taught at the University of Dar es Salaam.

On his return to the UK he was a lecturer at the Open University and then Director of the External Programme at Wye College. He joined the Institute for Development Policy and Management at the University of Manchester in the early 1990s, then the School of Oriental and African Studies, as professor of a new Development Studies Department.

He retired in 2011. He was adjunct professor at China Agricultural University, Beijing. He has also taught and researched in South Africa, China and the USA.

== Publications ==
His publications include:-

- Bernstein, Henry (1973). Underdevelopment and Development: Third World Today. Harmondsworth: Penguin. ISBN 0140807233.
- Bernstein, H; Crow, B; Mackintosh, M; Martin, C, eds. (1990). The Food Question. London: Earthscan. ISBN 1853830631.
- Bernstein, Henry; Crow, Ben; Johnson, Hazel (1992). Rural Livelihoods: Crises and Responses. Oxford: Oxford University Press. ISBN 019877334X.
- Valentine, Daniel E; Bernstein, Henry; Brass, Tom, eds. (1992). Plantations, Proletarians and Peasants in Colonial Asia. London: Cass. ISBN 0714634670.
- Bernstein, Henry; Brass, Tom, eds. (1996). Agrarian Questions: Essays in Appreciation of T J Byres. London: Routledge. ISBN 9781315821955.
- Bernstein, Henry, ed. (1996). The Agrarian Question in South Africa. London: Cass. ISBN 0714647373.
- Woodhouse, Phil; Hulme, David; Bernstein, Henry (2000). African Enclosures? The Social Dynamics of Wetlands in Drylands. Woodbridge: James Currey. ISBN 0865439370.
- Bernstein, Henry (2000). "The Peasantry". Global Capitalism: Who, Where and Why. London: Merlin Press: 25–51. ISBN 1583670297.
- Bernstein, Henry (2010). Class Dynamics of Agrarian Change. Halifax NS: Fernwood. ISBN 9781565493568.
