= Agrarian structure =

Pattern of land distribution among landholders

Agrarian structure is the pattern of land (area group) distribution among landholders (agricultural households).
