= 1952 Liechtenstein insurance referendum =

- 14 December 1952
- Referendum on introducing insurance for the elderly and bereaved

Results
Choice	Votes	%
Yes	1,574	53.54%
No	1,366	46.46%
Valid votes	2,940	96.36%
Invalid or blank votes	111	3.64%
Total votes	3,051	100.00%
Registered voters/turnout	3,379	90.29%

A referendum on introducing insurance for the elderly and bereaved was held in Liechtenstein on 14 December 1952. The proposal was approved by 53.5% of voters.

== Results ==
Choice	Votes	%
For	1,574	53.5
Against	1,366	46.5
Invalid/blank votes	111	–
Total	3,051	100
Registered voters/turnout	3,379	90.3
Source: Nohlen & Stöver
