= Liechtenstein Employees' Association =

Trade union of Liechtenstein

LANV
- Liechtenstein Employees' Association
- Liechtensteiner ArbeitnehmerInnenverband
- Founded: 2 February 1920
- Headquarters: Triesen, Liechtenstein
- Members: 1,300
- Key people: Sigi Langenbahn, president
- Affiliations: ITUC, ETUC
- Website: www.lanv.li

The Liechtenstein Employees' Association (German: Liechtensteiner ArbeitnehmerInnenverband, LANV) is the only trade union in Liechtenstein. It was founded in 1920 as the Liechtenstein Workers' Association (Liechtensteinischer Arbeiterverband), keeping this name until 1970. It is affiliated with the International Trade Union Confederation.
