= List of Workers and Small Farmers =

Defunct electoral group in Liechtenstein

List of Workers and Small Farmers Liste der Unselbständig Erwerbenden und Kleinbauern
- Founded: 5 October 1952
- Dissolved: 1953
- National affiliation: Liechtenstein Workers' Association

The List of Workers and Small Farmers (German: Liste der Unselbständig Erwerbenden und Kleinbauern, UEK) was an electoral group in Liechtenstein that was formed by the Liechtenstein Workers' Association to contest the February 1953 general election.

== History ==
Due to no workers being represented in the Landtag from in the 1949–1953 legislative term, on 5 October 1952 the Liechtenstein Workers' Association voted to create its own electoral group to contest the February 1953 general election. The group did not consider itself a political party, but rather a list nonpartisan workers. Its programme included issues such as the expansion of social legislation, European integration, immigration, employment, and affordable housing. Notably, the list included former Patriotic Union Landtag member Josef Sele.

In the election, the group received 6.9% of the vote, but failed to reach the electoral threshold of 18% to win seats in the Landtag. It did not contest any subsequent elections.

== Election results ==
Election	Votes	%	Seats	Outcome
February 1953	198	6.86	0 / 25	No seats

== Bibliography ==
- Nohlen, Dieter; Stöver, Philip (2010). Elections in Europe: A data handbook. Nomos. ISBN 978-3-8329-5609-7.
- Vogt, Paul (1987). 125 Jahre Landtag (in German). Vaduz: Landtag of the Principality of Liechtenstein.
- Fehr, Alice; Quaderer, Rupert; Geiger, Peter; Brunhart, Arthur; Schädler, Alfons (1995). 75 Jahre Liechtensteiner Arbeitnehmerverband [75 years of the Liechtensteiner Workers' Association] (in German). Vaduz: Liechtenstein Employees' Association – via Liechtenstein State Library.
