= List of green political parties =

This is a list of parties in the world that consider themselves to be upholding the principles and values of green politics. Some are also members of the Global Greens, the European Green Party, the Nordic Green Left Alliance or other international organizations. Note that, in some cases, a party's self-described adherence to environmentalism may be disputed by its critics.

== Alphabetical list by country ==
=== A ===
Albania

- Green Party of Albania

Andorra

- Greens of Andorra

Argentina

- Green Initiative (2006–2010, defunct)

Armenia

- Green Party of Armenia

Australia

- United Tasmania Group (1973–1977, defunct)
- Australian Greens (since 1993)
- Nuclear Disarmament Party (1983–2009, defunct)

Austria

- The Greens – The Green Alternative

=== B ===
Bangladesh

- Bangladesh Green Party (since 2026)

Belgium

- Ecolo (since 1980)
- Groen (since 1982)

Belarus

- Belarusian Green Party (1994–2023, defunct)

Belize

- Belize Green Independent Party

Bolivia

- Green Party of Bolivia (since 2007)

Bosnia and Herzegovina

- Bosnian-Herzegovinian Greens

Brazil

- Green Party (since 1986)
- Sustainability Network

Bulgaria

- Green Party of Bulgaria (since 1989)
- The Greens (since 2008)

Burkina Faso

- Ecologist Party for the Development of Burkina
- Greens of Burkina
- Rally of the Ecologists of Burkina

=== C ===
Canada

- Green Party of Canada
  - Green Party of Alberta
  - Green Party of British Columbia
  - Green Party of Manitoba
  - Green Party of New Brunswick
  - Green Party of Nova Scotia
  - Green Party of Ontario
  - Green Party of Prince Edward Island
  - Green Party of Quebec
  - Green Party of Saskatchewan
  - Yukon Green Party

Chile

- Green Ecologist Party (since 2008)

Colombia

- Colombian Green Party (since 2005)
- Oxygen Green Party (since 1998-2005, 2021)

Costa Rica

- Cartago Green Party

Croatia

- Sustainable Development of Croatia (since 2013)
- We Can! – Political Platform (since 2019)

Cyprus

- Movement of Ecologists — Citizens' Cooperation

Czech Republic

- Green Party (since 1989)
- Democratic Party of Greens (since 2009)

=== D ===
Democratic Republic of the Congo

- Rally of Congolese Ecologists – The Greens

Denmark

- The Alternative (since 2013)
- Red-Green Alliance (since 1989)
- Socialist People's Party (since 1959)
- Independent Greens (since 2020)

Dominican Republic

- Dominican Green Party

=== E ===
Egypt

- Egyptian Green Party (since 1990)

Estonia

- Estonian Greens (since 2006)

=== F ===
Fiji

- Green Party of Fiji (2008–2013, defunct)

Finland

- Green League (since 1987)

France

- The Greens (1984–2010), merged with Europe Écologie into:
  - Europe Ecology – The Greens
- Génération.s

=== G ===
Georgia

- Green Party of Georgia (since 1990s)

Germany

- Alliance '90/The Greens (founded in 1979 as The Greens, merged in 1990 with Alliance 90)
- Ecological Democratic Party (since 1982)
- Klimaliste (since 2021)
- Mut (since 2017)

Greece

- Ecologist Greens (since 2002)

Guyana

- Good and Green Guyana (founded 1994 – defunct 1997)

=== H ===
Hong Kong

- Citizens Party (from 1997 to 2008)

Hungary

- Dialogue – The Greens' Party (since 2013)
- Green Left (Hungary) (2009–2018)
- Hungarian Social Green Party (since 1995)
- LMP – Hungary's Green Party (since 2009)

=== I ===
Iceland

- Left-Green Movement

India

- Green Party of India
- India Greens Party
- Indian National Green Party
- Indian Peoples Green Party

Indonesia

- Indonesian Green Party
- Atjeh Green Party

Iran

- Green Party of Iran

Iraq

- Green Party of Iraq

Ireland

- Green Party (Ireland)
  - Green Party in Northern Ireland
- Rabharta

Isle of Man

- Isle of Man Green Party

Israel

- The Greens (Israel) (since 1997)
- The Green Party (Israel) (since 2008)

Italy

- Federation of the Greens (since 1990)
- Greens (South Tyrol)
- Green Europe
- Greens and Left Alliance

=== J ===
Japan

- Midori no Tō Greens Japan

=== K ===
Kenya

- Mazingira Green Party of Kenya

Kosovo

- Green Party of Kosovo

Kurdistan

- The Green Party of Kurdistan (since 2008)

=== L ===
Latvia

- Latvian Green Party

Lebanon

- Green Party of Lebanon

Liechtenstein

- Free List

Lithuania

- Lithuanian Green Party
- Lithuanian Farmers and Greens Union

Luxembourg

- The Greens

=== M ===
Malaysia

- Green Party of Malaysia

Mali

- Ecologist Party of Mali

Malta

- AD+PD (founded in 1989 as Democratic Alternative, merged in 2020 with the Democratic Party)
- Momentum

Mauritius

- Les Verts Fraternels

Mexico

- Ecologist Green Party of Mexico (since 1993)

Moldova

- Ecologist Green Party (Moldova)

Mongolia

- Civil Will-Green Party
- Mongolian Green Party

Montenegro

- United Reform Action (since 2017)
- Greens of Montenegro (2002, defunct)

Morocco

- Izigzawen

Mozambique

- Greens Party of Mozambique

=== N ===
Nepal

- Hariyali

Netherlands

- De Groenen (since 1983)
- GroenLinks (since 1989)
- Party for the Animals (since 2002)

New Zealand

- Values Party (1972, defunct)
- Green Party of Aotearoa New Zealand

Nicaragua

- Ecologist Green Party of Nicaragua

North Macedonia

- Democratic Renewal of Macedonia

Norway

- Green Party
- Socialist Left Party (Norway)

=== P ===
Pakistan

- Pakistan Green Party

Papua New Guinea

- Papua New Guinea Greens

Peru

- Green Alternative Ecologist Party of Peru

==== Philippines ====
- Philippine Green Republican Party

Poland

- The Greens

Portugal

- Ecologist Party "The Greens"
- LIVRE

=== R ===
Romania

- Green Party

Russia

- Civil United Green Alternative (since 1991)
- Russian Ecological Party "The Greens" (since 1992)
- Union of Greens of Russia (established 2005; in 2006 joined Yabloko)
- Green Alternative (since 2020)

Rwanda

- Democratic Green Party of Rwanda

=== S ===
Saint Lucia

- The National Green Party - Saint Lucia

Saint Vincent and the Grenadines

- Saint Vincent and the Grenadines Green Party

Senegal

- Rally of the Ecologists of Senegal

Serbia

- Greens of Serbia (since 2007)
- Together (since 2022)
- Green–Left Front (since 2023)
- Together for Serbia (2012–2022)
- Green Party (2014–2021)
- Do not let Belgrade drown (2014–2023)
- Ecological Uprising (2021–2022)

Slovakia

- Green Party

Slovenia

- Greens of Slovenia
- The Left (Slovenia)
- Vesna – Green Party
- Youth Party – European Greens

South Africa

- Green Party of South Africa

South Korea

- Green Party Korea

Somalia

- Somalia Green Party

Spain

- Equo (since 2011)
- Green Left (Catalonia)
- Más Madrid (since 2019)

Sweden

- Green Party

Switzerland

- Green Party of Switzerland (since 1983)
- Green Liberal Party of Switzerland (since 2007)

=== T ===
Taiwan

- Green Party Taiwan

Thailand

- Thai Forest Conservation Party

Tunisia

- Green Tunisia Party

Turkey

- Green Party (reestablished 2020)
- Peoples' Equality and Democracy Party (founded as a merger between the People's Democratic Party & Green Left Party in 2023)
- Party of the Greens and the Left Future

=== U ===
Uganda

- Uganda Green Party

Ukraine

- Party of Greens of Ukraine

United Kingdom

- National, previously Green Party (1972–1990)
  - Green Party of England and Wales
    - London Green Party
    - Wales Green Party
  - Green Party (Ireland)
    - Green Party in Northern Ireland
  - Scottish Green Party
- Other
  - Alliance for Green Socialism
  - Independent Green Voice
  - Climate Party

United States

- Green Party of the United States (since 1991)
  - List of state Green Parties in the United States
- Independent Greens of Virginia (since 2003)
- Independent Greens US (since 2020)
  - New Arizona Green Party (since 2025)
  - Georgia Green Party (Independent since 2021)
  - Green Party of Alaska (Independent since 2021)
  - Green Party of Rhode Island (Independent since 2020)
- Ocean State Green Party (2021)

Uruguay

- Green Eto-Ecologist Party (1987–2009)
- Ecologist Radical Intransigent Party (since 2013)
- Green Animalist Party (since 2018)

Uzbekistan

- Ecological Movement of Uzbekistan

=== V ===
Vanuatu

- Green Confederation

Venezuela

- Ecological Movement of Venezuela

== See also ==
- Green party
