= Green Party =

Green Party or Greens Party may refer to:

- Green party, a political party based on the principles of green politics
  - List of green political parties
- Green Party of Albania
- Australian Greens
  - List of member parties of the Australian Greens
- The Greens (Austria)
- Belarusian Green Party
- Belize Green Independent Party
- Green Party of Bolivia
- Green Party (Brazil)
- Green Party (Bulgaria)
- Green Party-Intwari, Burundi
- Green Party of Canada
  - Alberta Greens, 1986–2009
  - Green Party of Alberta, 2011–present
  - Green Party of British Columbia
    - Green Party of Vancouver
  - Green Party of Manitoba
  - Green Party of New Brunswick
  - Green Party of Nova Scotia
  - Green Party of Ontario
  - Green Party of Prince Edward Island
  - Green Party of Quebec
  - Green Party of Saskatchewan
  - Yukon Green Party
- Green Ecologist Party (Chile)
- Cartago Green Party, Costa Rica
- Green Party – Green Alternative, Croatia
- Green Party (Czech Republic)
- Dominican Green Party
- Egyptian Green Party
- European Green Party
- Green Party of Fiji
- Green League, Finland
- The Greens (France)
- Greens Party of Georgia
- Alliance 90/The Greens, Germany
- East German Green Party, 1990
- Green Party of Hungary, 1989–2011
- Hungarian Social Green Party
- Party of Greens (Hungary)
- The Greens (Iceland)
- Green Party of Iran
- Green Party (Iran)
- Green Party of Iraq
- Green Party (Ireland)
- The Greens (Israel)
- Green Party (Israel)
- Greens Japan
- Mazingira Green Party of Kenya
- Green Party of Kosovo
- Latvian Green Party
- Green Party of Lebanon
- Lithuanian Green Party
- The Greens (Luxembourg)
- Madagascar Green Party
- Green Party of Malaysia
- Ecologist Green Party of Mexico
- Ecologist Green Party (Moldova)
- Civil Will–Green Party, Mongolia
- Mongolian Green Party
- Party of Greens of Mozambique
- Green Party of the Netherlands
- The Greens (Netherlands)
- Green Party of Aotearoa New Zealand
- Ecologist Green Party of Nicaragua
- Green Party (Norway)
- Pakistan Green Party
- Papua New Guinea Greens
- Philippine Green Republican Party
- The Greens (Poland)
- Ecologist Party "The Greens", Portugal
- Green Party (Romania)
- Russian Ecological Party "The Greens"
- Democratic Green Party of Rwanda
- Saint Vincent and the Grenadines Green Party
- Green Party (Serbia)
- Green Party (Slovakia)
- Slovak Green Party
- Somalia Green Party
- Green Party of South Africa
- Green Party Korea, South Korea
- Confederation of the Greens, Spain
- Green Party (Spain)
- The Greens–Green Alternative, Catalonia, Spain
- Green Party (Sweden)
- Green Party of Switzerland
- Green Party Taiwan
- Green Tunisia Party
- Greens Party (Turkey), 2008–12
- Uganda Green Party
- Party of Greens of Ukraine
- Green Party (UK), 1973–90
- Green Party of England and Wales, UK
  - London Green Party, England, UK
- Wales Green Party, UK
- Green Party Northern Ireland, UK
- Scottish Greens, UK
- Greens/Green Party USA, 1991-2019
- Green Party of the United States
  - List of state Green Parties in the United States

== See also ==
- Greens (disambiguation)
- The Greens (disambiguation)
- Progressive Green Party (disambiguation)
- Green Movement (disambiguation)
