= Federation of Green Parties of Africa =

Political umbrella body

The Federation of Green Parties of Africa is an umbrella body of the various national Green parties and environmental parties in Africa. The formal coalition, the African Greens Federation (AGF) formed in 2010 at a conference in Kampala, Uganda. As part of the Global Greens, founded in 2001 in Canberra, Australia, the parties included in the Federation of Green Parties of Africa follow the Global Greens Charter. The organization's permanent administration is in Ouagadougou, the capital of Burkina Faso, where the predominant green organization is the Rassemblement Des Ecologistes du Burkina Faso. These parties tend to, but not always, be left-leaning and often do not have widespread support in their respective countries.

Principles of the Global Green Charter include:

- Participatory Democracy
- Nonviolence
- Social justice
- Sustainability
- Respect for Diversity
- Ecological Wisdom
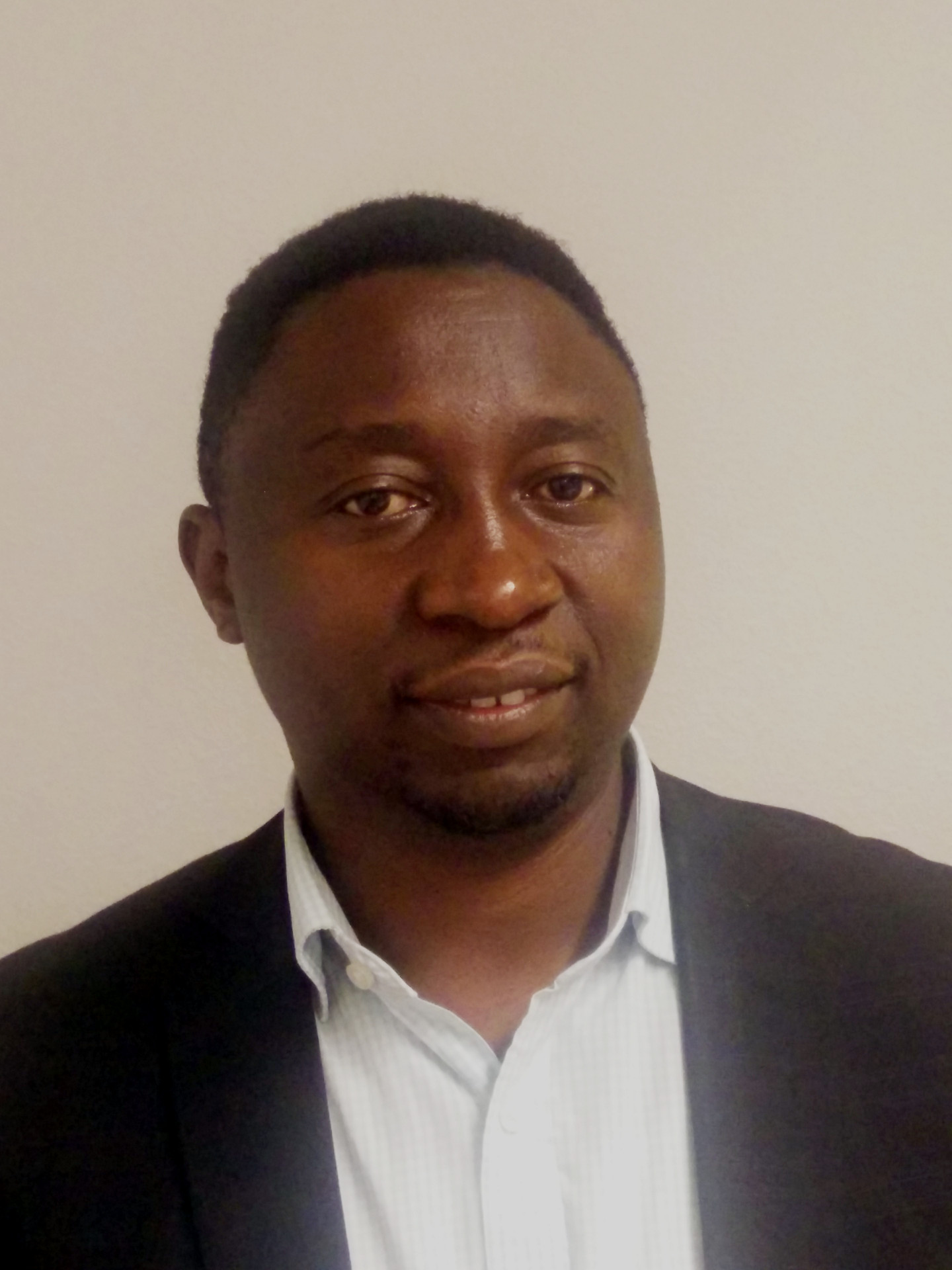
  Dr. Frank Habineza, President of Federation of Green Parties of Africa

Current leadership includes the President, Dr. Frank Habineza of the Democratic Green Party of Rwanda, Papa Meissa Dieng of the Convergence of Ecologists of Senegal (CES) as the Secretary General, and Robinah K. Nanyunja as treasurer. Nanyunja is an environmentalist from Uganda.

Goals of the coalition include helping such parties gain more political power, such as joining the parliamentary or legislative bodies. Such was a success for the Democratic Green Party of Rwanda, which gained a sufficient percent of the vote in 2018, allowing them to gain representation in the Rwandan parliament.

In addition to political parties, the ENGOs, or environmental non-governmental organizations, have played an important role on the continent after colonization in order to push for development and basic needs delivery.

== Member parties ==
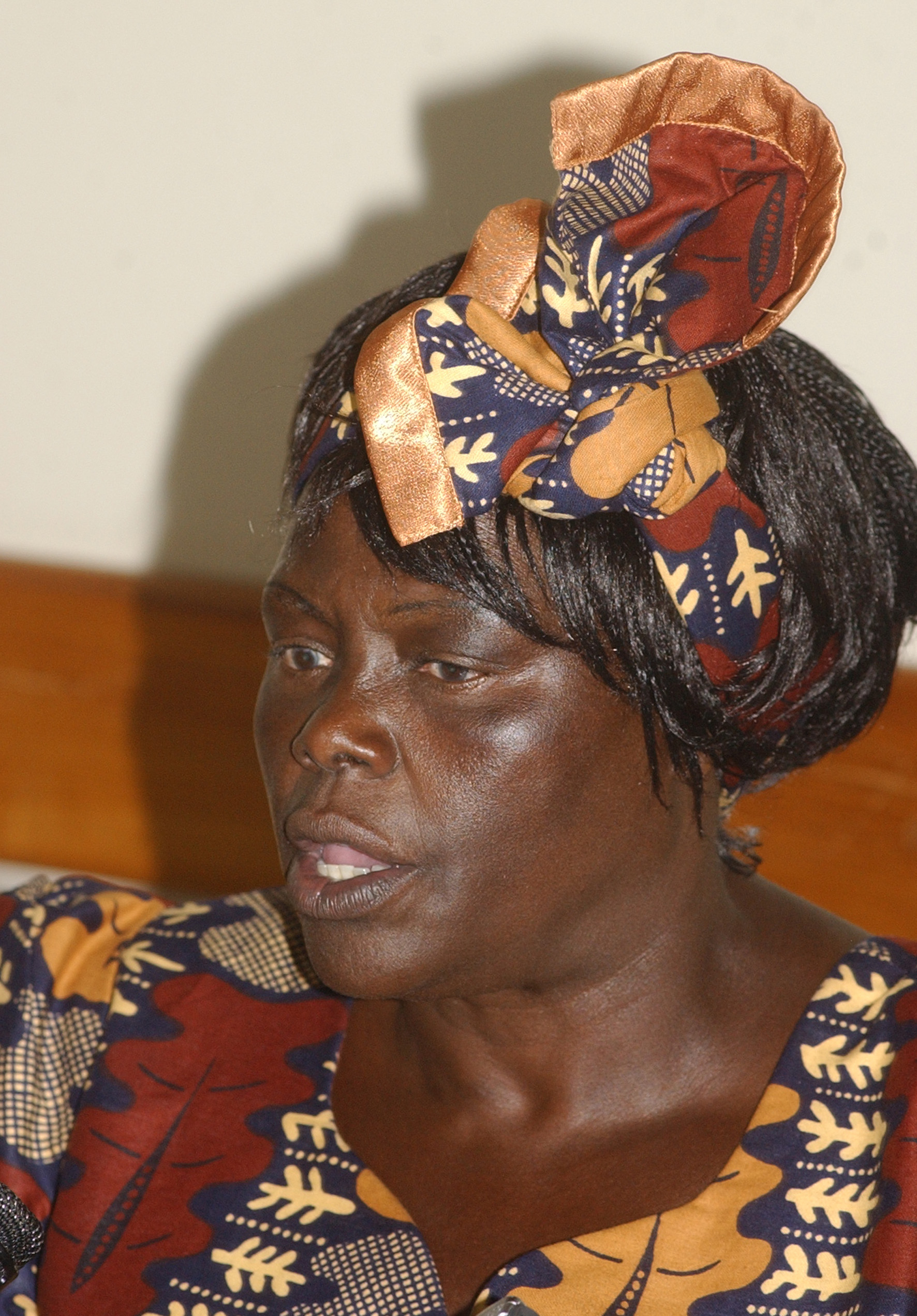
Wangari Maathai.

Full Member Parties and Organizations

- Algeria: Algerian Green Party for Development
- Burkina Faso: Rally of the Ecologists of Burkina
- Burundi: Burundi Green Movement
- Chad: Union of Chadian Ecologists/The Greens
- Democratic Republic of Congo: Alliance of Congolese Ecologists – The Greens
- Republic of Congo: Movement of Congolese Ecologists – The Greens
- Egypt: Egyptian Green Party
- Ivory Coast: Rally of Ivorian Greens
- Kenya: Green Congress of Kenya
- Madagascar: Madagascar Green Party
- Mali: Ecologist Party of Mali
- Mauritius: Fraternal Greens
- Morocco: Green Left Party
- Mozambique: Ecological Party of Mozambique - Movement of Earth
- Niger: Rally for a Green Sahel / Green Party of Niger
- Rwanda: Democratic Green Party of Rwanda
- Senegal: Convergence of Ecologists of Senegal
- Togo: Africa Togo Ecology
- Tunisia: Green Party for Progress
- Uganda: Ecological Party of Uganda
- Zambia: Green Party of Zambia
- Zimbabwe: Green Party of Zimbabwe-United Crusade for Democracy (UCAD-Green Party)

== Other African non-members and observers ==
- Algeria:
  - Ecology and Liberty Party
- Angola:
  - National Ecological Party of Angola
- Burkina Faso:
  - Ecologist Party for the Development of Burkina
  - Ecologist Party for Progress
  - Union of Greens for the Development of Burkina Faso
- Cameroon:
  - Green Party for Democracy in Cameroon
  - Rally of Ecologic Forces for the Stimulation of the Economy
  - Union of Ecologists of Cameroon
- Central African Republic:
  - Movement of Greens of Central Africa
- Republic of the Congo:
  - Movement of Greens of Congo
- Democratic Republic of the Congo:
  - Rally of Congolese Ecologists - The Greens
  - Party of Congolese Ecologists
- Côte d'Ivoire:
  - Ecologic Party of Greens of Côte d'Ivoire
- Gabon:
  - Gabonese Ecologist Front
- Mauritius:
  - Green Brothers
  - The Greens
- Madagascar:
  - Madagascar Green Party
  - National Union for Democracy and Development
- Morocco:
  - Izigzawen
  - Ecology and Development
  - Environment and Development Party
- Mozambique
  - Party of Greens of Mozambique
- Niger:
  - Green Party Rally - Ni'ima
- Nigeria
  - Green Party of Nigeria
- Rwanda:
  - Democratic Green Party of Rwanda
- Senegal:
  - African Green Party of Senegal
- Sudan:
  - Sudan Green Party
- South Africa
  - ECOPEACE Party
- Togo:
  - Pan-African Ecologist Party
- Tunisia
  - Green Party for Progress
  - Green Tunisia Party
- Uganda
  - Uganda Green Party
- Zambia
  - Liberal Green Party of Zambia

== Sister bodies ==
Sister continental Green Party organizations include the Federation of the Green Parties of the Americas, Asia-Pacific Green Network and European Federation of Green Parties.

== See also ==
- Biodiversity
- Conservation movement
- Conservation ethic
- Environmental movement
- Ecology
- Ecosystem
- Earth Science
- Global Greens
- Global warming
- List of environmental organizations
- Natural environment
- Nature
- Sustainability
- Worldwide green parties
