= Asia Pacific Greens Federation =

Federation of parties

- Abbreviation: APGF
- Formation: 14 June 2015; 11 years ago
- Type: International nongovernmental organization
- Legal status: Federation
- Purpose: Regional network of green political parties and organizations
- Headquarters: 2/97 Northbourne Avenue, Turner, ACT Australia
- Region served: Asia-Pacific
- Members: 21 parties
- Convenor: Tika Dhoj Bhandari; Erum Saleem Khan
- General Secretary: Pefi Kingi
- Treasure: Sue Etheridge
- Main organ: APGF Council
- Website: www.asiapacificgreens.org

The Asia Pacific Greens Federation (APGF), formerly the Asia Pacific Greens Network, is a federation of national Green parties and related organisations in countries in the Pacific Ocean and Asia, and is one of the four Federations that constitute the Global Greens.

The Federation's purpose is to promote and implement the Global Greens Charter by providing and promoting support to, coordination of, and collaboration between its member Green political parties.

The Federation is governed by APGF Council, which meets monthly and serves as the Board of Directors, and APGF Congress, which meets approximately every 5 years. APGF is led by two co-Convenors, the General Secretary, and the Treasurer. Along with other members appointed by APGF Council, these officers comprise the Management and Administration Committee, which oversees day-to-day operations.

The third Asia-Pacific Greens Congress was held in Wellington, New Zealand from June 12–14, 2015. One of the greatest achievements of the Congress was adoption of the Asia-Pacific Greens Federation Constitution. Adoption of the new Constitution marked the beginning of the Asia-Pacific Greens Federation, with a new structure and governance provisions reflecting its role within the international Green movement.

== Full member parties ==
Full member parties:

- Australia:
  - Australian Greens
- Bangladesh:
  - Bangladesh Green Party
- India:
  - India Greens Party
  - Uttarakhand Parivartan Party
- Iraq:
  - National Green Party of Iraq
- Indonesia:
  - Sarekat Hijau Indonesia
- Japan:
  - Greens Japan
- Lebanon:
  - Green Party of Lebanon
- Mongolia:
  - Mongolian Green Party
- Nepal:
  - Nepali Greens Party
- New Zealand:
  - Green Party of Aotearoa New Zealand
- Pakistan:
  - Pakistan Green Party
- Papua New Guinea
  - Greens Party Papua New Guinea
- Solomon Islands:
  - Green Party Solomon Islands
- South Korea:
  - Green Party Korea
- Taiwan:
  - Green Party Taiwan

== Associate member parties ==
Vandana Shiva in Cologne, Germany in 2007

Associate member parties:

- Indonesia:
  - Green Aceh Party
  - Indonesian Green Party
- Jordan:
  - Jordanian Democratic Nature Party
- Palestine:
  - Palestinian Greens
- Philippines:
  - Green Party of the Philippines-Kalikasan Muna

== See also ==
- Global Greens
