= Global Greens =

International organization of political parties

- Logo
- Abbreviation: GG
- Formation: 12 April 2001; 25 years ago
- Type: International non-governmental organization Political international
- Legal status: Association
- Purpose: World network of green political parties and organizations
- Headquarters: Rue Wiertz 31, 1050 Brussels, Belgium
- Region served: Worldwide
- Members: 87 political parties and 9 organizations
- Co-Convenors: Frank Habineza and Bodil Valero
- Main organ: Global Greens Congress
- Website: www.globalgreens.org

The Global Greens (GG) is an international network of political parties and movements which work to implement the Global Greens Charter. It consists of various national green political parties, partner networks, and other organizations associated with green politics.

Formed in 2001 at the First Global Greens Congress, the network has grown to include 76 full member parties and 11 observers and associate parties as of May 2022, so a total of 87 members. It is governed by a 12-member steering committee called the Global Greens Coordination (GGC), consisting of nominated representatives from each of the four regional federations. Each member party falls under the umbrella of one of these four affiliated regional green federations– Africa, Asia-Pacific, the Americas, and Europe. The day-to-day operations of the Global Greens are managed by the Secretariat, with current Co-Conveners Frank Habineza and Bodil Valero responsible for coordinating the work of the Executive, the Secretariat and the GGC.

== History ==
The world's first green parties were founded in 1972. These were in the Australian state of Tasmania (the United Tasmania Group) and in New Zealand (the Values Party). Others followed quickly: in 1973, PEOPLE (later the Ecology Party) was set up in the UK, and in other European countries Green and radical parties sprang up in the following years.

Petra Kelly, a German ecofeminist activist, is often cited as one of the first thinkers and leaders of the green politics movement. Her work in founding the German Green Party in West Germany in 1980 was instrumental in bringing prominence to green political parties on both the national and international stages.

The first Planetary Meeting of the Greens was held in Rio de Janeiro on May 30–31, 1992 in conjunction with the Rio Earth Summit being concurrently held in Brazil. It was here that the first ever Global Greens statement was issued, beginning with this preface:

Experience teaches us that governments are only moved to take environmental problems seriously when people vote for environmental political parties.

— Final Statement of the First Planetary Meeting of Greens in Rio de Janeiro, 31 May 1992

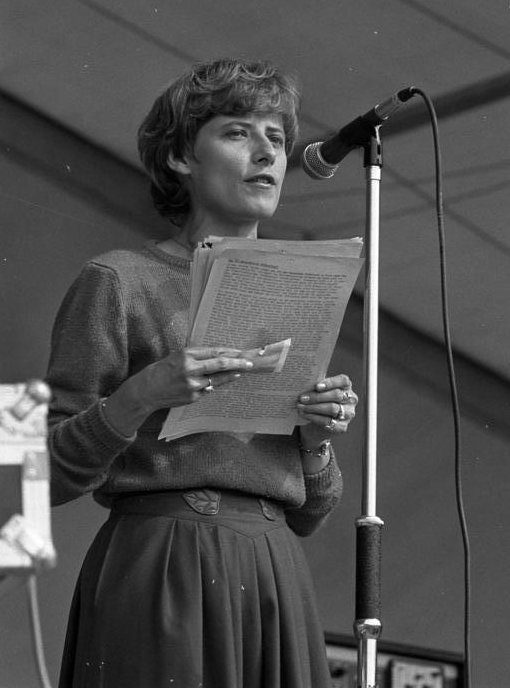
Petra Kelly, a German ecofeminist and green politics thinker who founded the German Green Party in 1980

The first Global Greens Congress was held in Canberra, Australia, in 2001. The official Global Greens Charter was issued here, and the Congress delegates set up the framework and organizational structures that would build the Global Greens into an ongoing international network and movement, including the Global Greens Coordination. In 2010, the first Global Greens Secretary was appointed.

== Global Greens Charter ==
The Global Greens Charter is the guiding document that establishes the principles and "core values" to which member parties and associated organizations should attempt to adhere. It sets out global principles that cross boundaries to bind Greens from around the world together:

1. Participatory democracy
2. Nonviolence
3. Social justice
4. Sustainability
5. Respect for Diversity
6. Ecological wisdom

Priorities outlined in the Charter include reforming the dominant economic model to include sustainable practices, combating climate change, eradicating the hunger crisis, advancing vibrant democracy, fostering peace, protecting biodiversity and striving toward universal human rights.

The Global Greens Charter has been reviewed and updated three times during Global Greens Congresses since its original publishing in 2001: once in Dakar, Senegal in 2012; again in Liverpool in 2017; and most recently South Korea in 2023. The updated 2023 version is offered in English, and past versions can be accessed in 11 various languages.

== Regional Federations of the Global Greens ==
The Global Greens are organized into four regional federations across the world:

- Asia Pacific Greens Federation
- European Green Party
- Federation of Green Parties of Africa
- Federation of the Green Parties of the Americas

== Global Greens Coordination ==
The Global Greens Coordination (GGC) is the primary decision-making body of Global Greens and acts as the General Assembly of the association. The GGC consists of representatives nominated by each of the four regional federations, including up to three full representatives and three alternatives/substitutes from each federation. Specific members are selected as "lead" representatives and are to be a part of the Executive Committee–responsible for the operational management and administrative work of Global Greens between Congresses.

== Global Greens Congress ==
The Global Greens have held five Congresses since 2001 in various locations:

1. 2001 – Canberra, Australia
2. 2008 – São Paulo, Brazil
3. 2012 – Dakar, Senegal
4. 2017 – Liverpool, UK
5. 2023 – Songdo, South Korea

== Networks and Working Groups ==
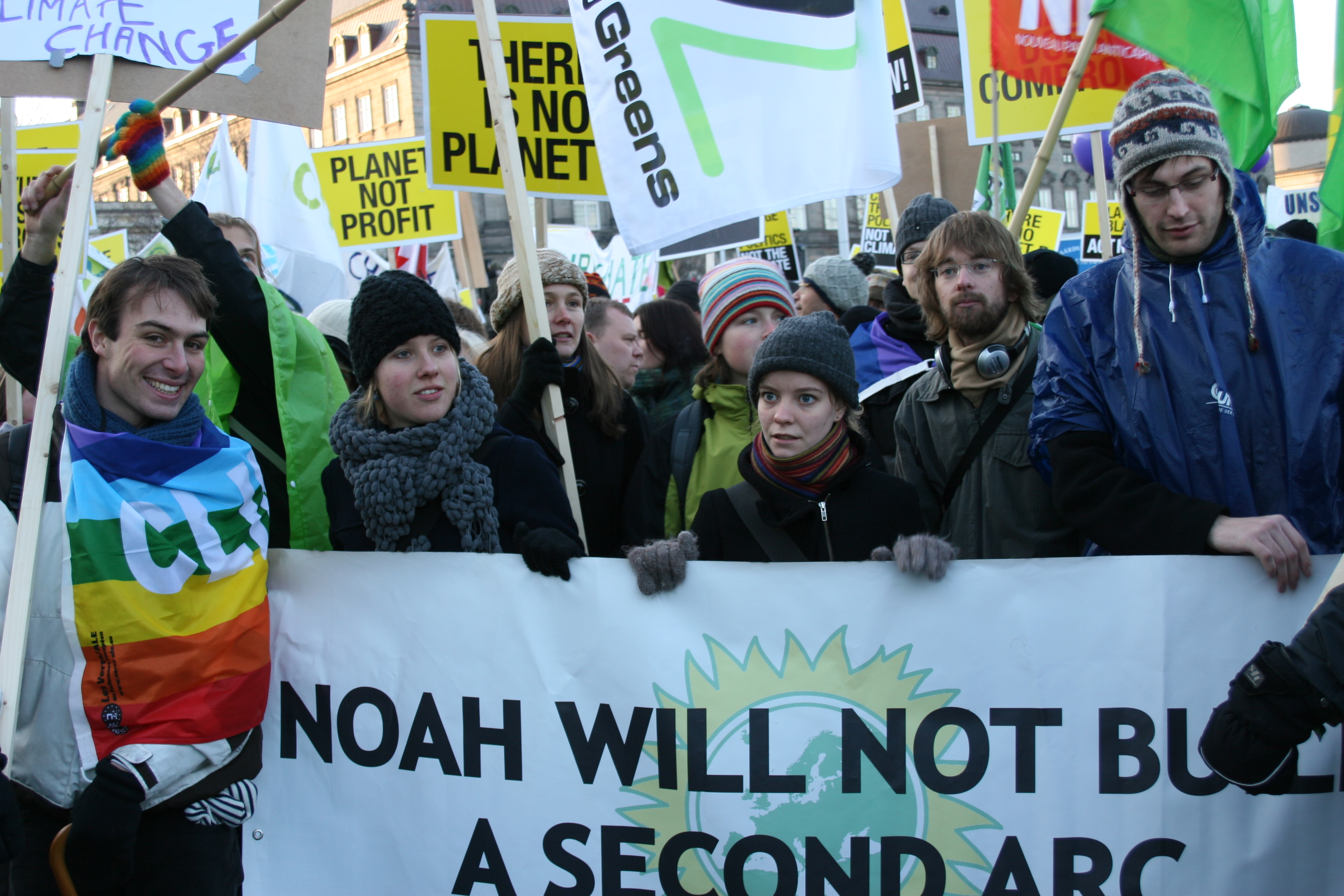
Federation of Young European Greens demonstration in Copenhagen, during the Climate Summit 2009

The Global Greens have five networks designed to enable global collaboration, communication and community among member parties and organizations:

- Climate Working Group
  - The Climate Working Group coordinates international efforts among Green parties to advance climate justice initiatives at the UNFCCC COPs.
  - It promotes ambitious legislative proposals aligned with the Paris Agreement, such as those showcased at COP summits.
  - The group also documents and shares climate-focused policy work of Green parliamentarians.
- Biodiversity Working Group
  - The Biodiversity Working Group was established following the Global Greens Congress in Korea to address issues related to the Convention on Biological Diversity. It brings together Greens globally to engage with biodiversity policy, particularly in coordination with the climate crisis.
- Strengthening Democracy Network
  - The Strengthening Democracy Network connects Green parties worldwide with the aim of supporting democratic systems, civic engagement, and the empowerment of communities.
- Global Greens Women's Network
  - This network supports the participation of Green women worldwide in democratic political processes, by focusing on:
    1. "Capacity building and empowerment: training and developing skills, such as public speaking and leadership;
    2. Governance and participation: confronting inequalities at the organizational level and exchanging best practices to tackle them and promote participation;
    3. Campaigning about major topics relevant to women: such as gender justice and climate change, and;
    4. Carrying out formal functions as part of global Greens governance: e.g. nominating women to the Asia-Pacific Greens Federation (APGF) Council."
- Global Young Greens
  - This network is a "youth-led organization supporting and uniting the efforts of young people from a green-alternative spectrum around the world. It works towards (1) ecological sustainability, (2) social justice, (3) grassroots democracy and (4) peace."

== Global Greens Ambassadors ==
The Global Greens Coordination appointed Christine Milne as the first Global Greens Ambassador in 2015. Milne was appointed as Global Greens Ambassador in recognition of her considerable expertise in climate change and as an elected member of state and federal parliaments, including as Leader of the Australian Greens.

== Member parties ==
At least one full member party supports or participates in national government. At least one full member party is present in the national legislature. At least one full member party is present. At least one associate member party is present.

=== Americas ===
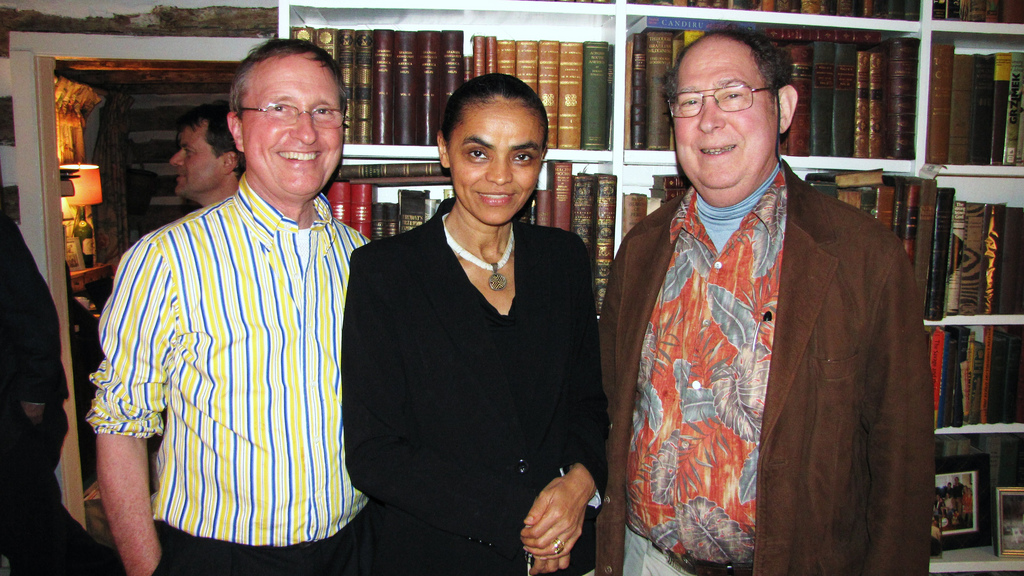
Marina Silva with Thomas Lovejoy and Stephen Schneider in April 2010

Affiliated members in North, Central and South America form the Federation of the Green Parties of the Americas.

Country	Name	National Government	Regional or Local Government	Notes
Argentina	Partido Verde	Extraparliamentary opposition	In opposition in Tierra del Fuego	
Bolivia	Partido Verde de Bolivia			
Brazil	Partido Verde	Junior party in coalition	The party is represented in several state legislatures.	in coalition 2003–2008
Canada	Green Party of Canada/Parti vert du Canada	Non-official party in the House of Commons.	Provincial: Alberta, British Columbia, Manitoba, New Brunswick, Nova Scotia, Ontario, Prince Edward Island, Quebec (Green Party of Quebec, Climat Québec), Saskatchewan; Municipal: Burnaby Green Party, Défi Vert de Québec, Green Party of Vancouver, Projet Montréal	
Chile	Partido Ecologista Verde de Chile	in opposition	Two seats on regional boards.	One seat in the Chamber of Deputies.
Colombia	Alianza Verde	Junior party in coalition	Claudia López Hernández, a green, was mayor of Bogota. The party also has 3 regional governors and several mayors.	
Dominican Republic	Partido Verde Dominicano			
Guatemala	Movimiento Verde			
Mexico	Partido Ecologista Verde de México	Supporting coalition	Represented in several regional parliaments	
Peru	Partido Verde Peru			
Venezuela	Movimiento Ecológico de Venezuela	Extraparliamentary opposition		
United States	Green Party of the United States		169 elected officials as of 2026. One at the state level.	Member 2001-2024

=== Asia and Oceania ===
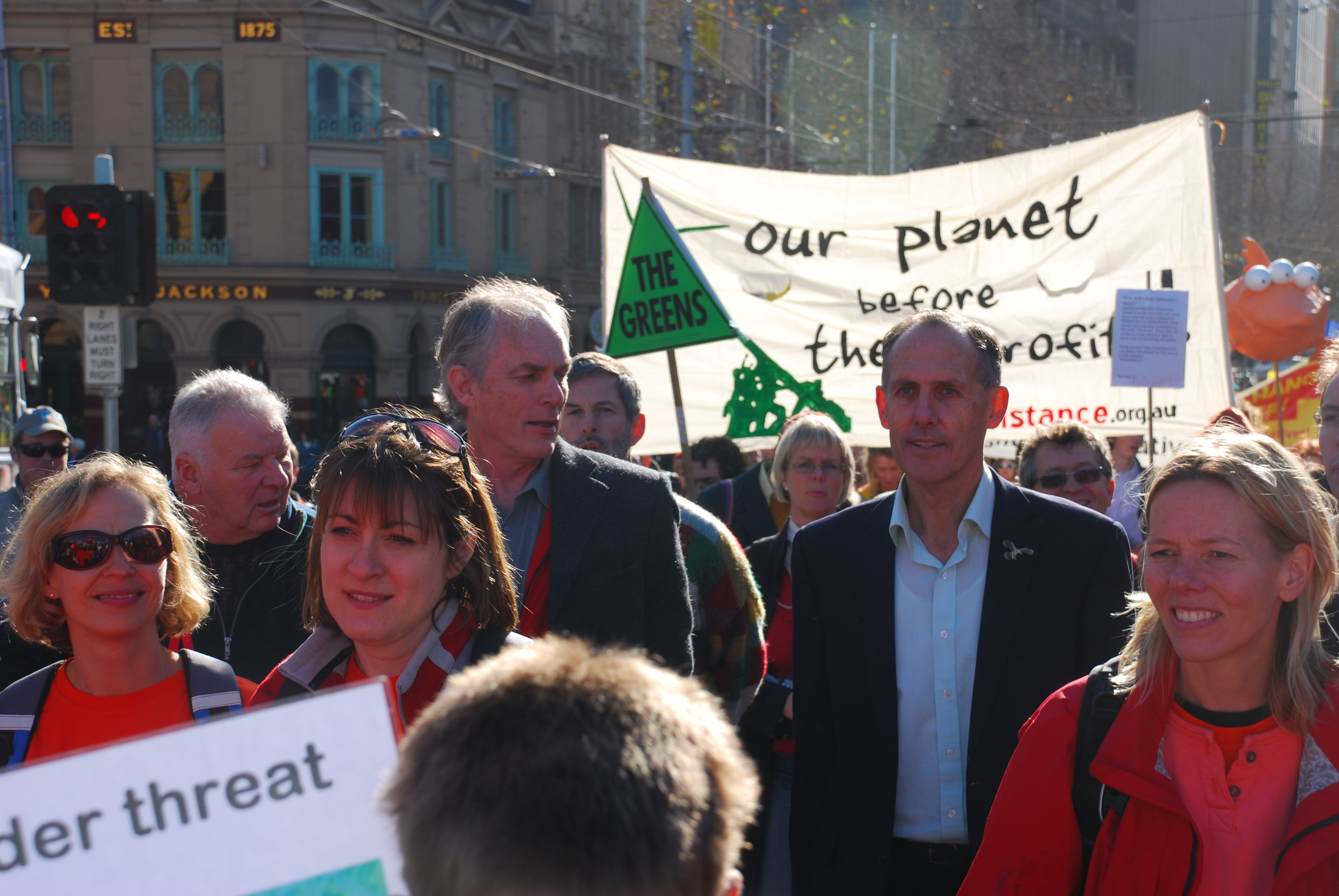
Bob Brown at a climate change rally in Melbourne on 5 July 2008

Affiliated members in Asia, Pacific and Oceania form the Asia Pacific Greens Federation.

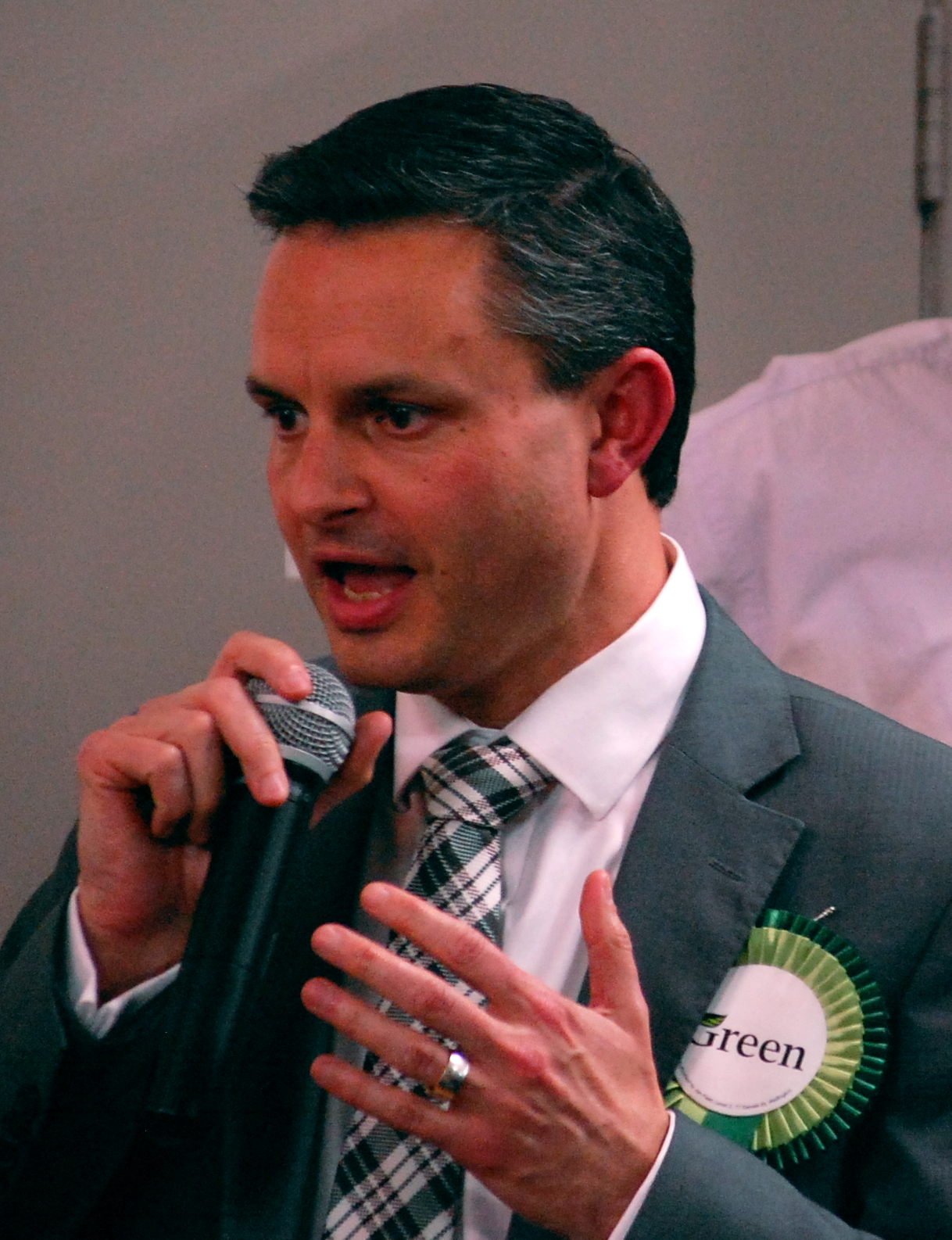
James Shaw, Minister for Climate Change (New Zealand), 2019

Country	Name	National Government	Regional or Local Government	Notes
Australia	Australian Greens	In opposition (crossbench)	Represented in all state and territory Parliaments, as well as in numerous local/city governments	Formerly in coalition in Tasmania and the Australian Capital Territory.
Bangladesh	Green Party of Bangladesh	Extraparliamentary opposition	Unknown	
India	India Greens Party	Extraparliamentary opposition	Unknown	
India	Uttarakhand Parivartan Party (UKPP)	Extraparliamentary opposition	Unknown	
Iraq	Green Party of Iraq	Extraparliamentary opposition	Unknown	
Japan	Greens Japan	Extraparliamentary opposition	Kazumi Inamura, a green, is mayor of Amagasaki	
South Korea	Green Party of Korea	Extraparliamentary opposition		
Lebanon	Green Party of Lebanon	Extraparliamentary opposition		
Mongolia	Mongolian Green Party	Extraparliamentary opposition		
Nepal	Hariyo Party	Extraparliamentary opposition		
New Zealand	Green Party of Aotearoa New Zealand	In opposition	The party endorsed the current mayor of Wellington Tory Whanau, and is represented on local councils in its own right in Wellington, Dunedin, and Palmerston North, and in Auckland through the City Vision joint ticket.	Formerly in coalition/Cooperation agreement/Confidence and supply in New Zealand from 1999 to 2008, 2017–2023
Pakistan	Pakistan Green Party	Extraparliamentary opposition		
Republic of China (Taiwan)	Green Party Taiwan	Extraparliamentary opposition	Represented in Hsinchu County	
Republic of China (Taiwan)	Trees Party	Extraparliamentary opposition		

=== Africa ===
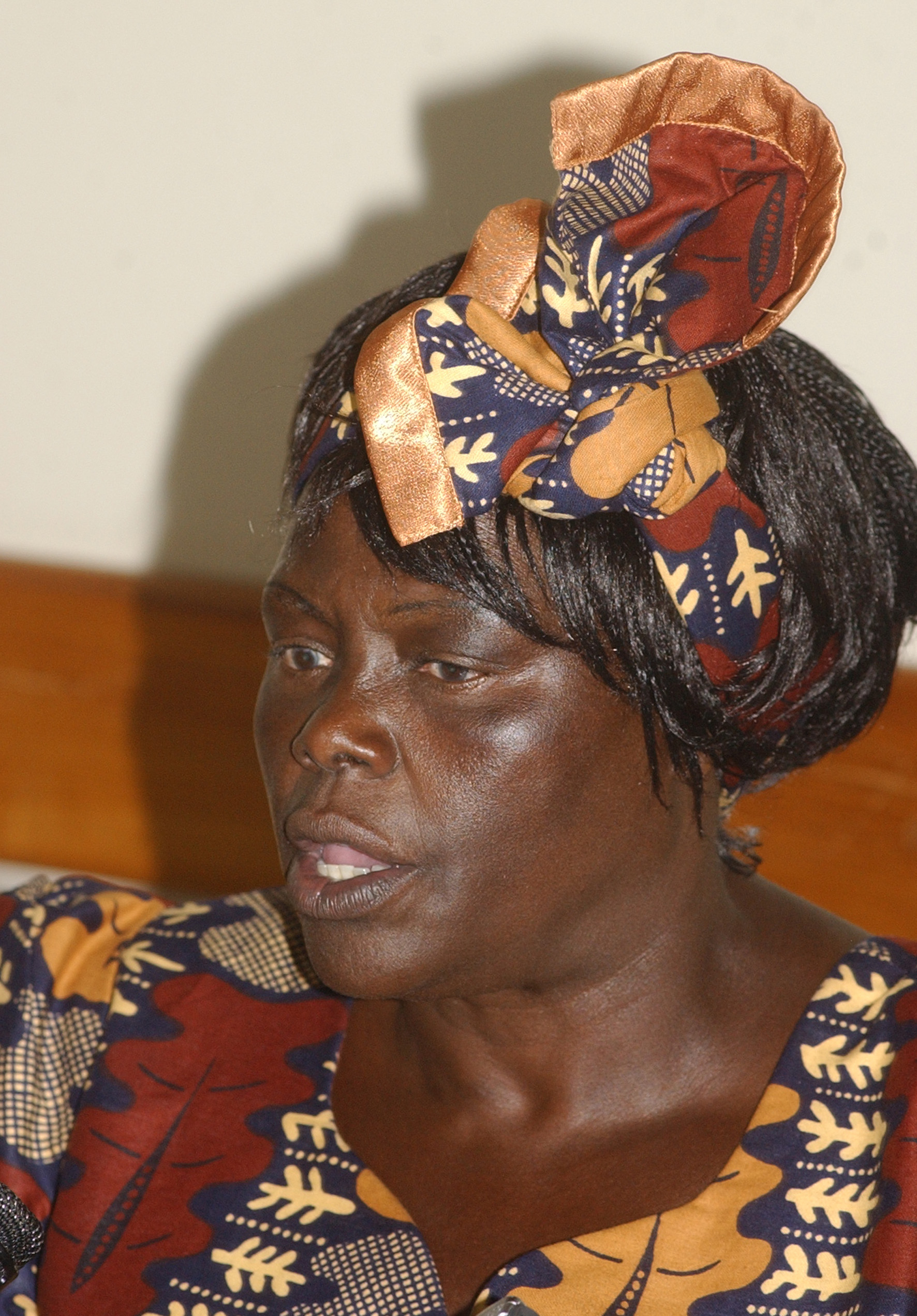
Wangari Maathai, Kenya

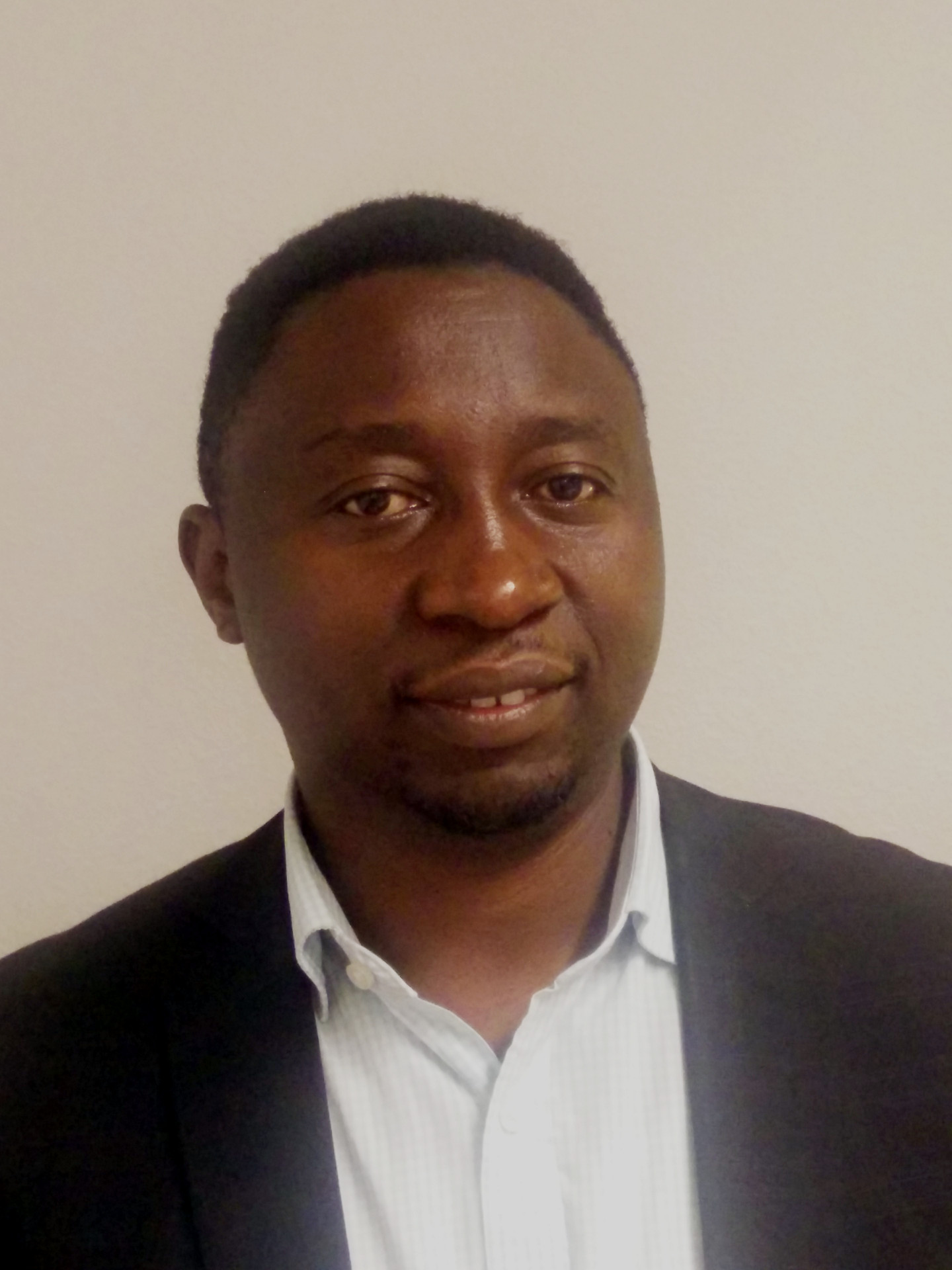
Frank Habineza, Leader of the African Greens Federation since 2008

Affiliated parties in Africa form the Federation of Green Parties of Africa.

Country	Name	National Government	Regional or Local Government	Notes
Angola	Partido Nacional Ecológico de Angola	Unknown		
Benin	Les Verts du Benin	Extraparliamentary opposition		
Burkina Faso	Parti Ecologiste pour le Développement du Burkina	Unknown		
Burkina Faso	Rally of the Ecologists of Burkina	Unknown		
Burundi	Burundi Green Movement	Unknown		
Central African Republic	Mouvement des Verts de Centrafique	Unknown		
Chad	Union des Ecologistes Tchadiens - LES VERTS	Unknown		
Democratic Republic of the Congo	Rassemblement des écologistes congolais	Extraparliamentary opposition		Represented in parliament 2006–11
Egypt	Egyptian Greens	Unknown		
Gabon	Parti Vert Gabonais/Gabon Green Party	Unknown		
Ghana	Ghana Green Movement	Unknown		
Guinea	Parti des Ecologistes Guineens	Unknown		
Ivory Coast	Parti Ecologique Ivoirien	Unknown		
Kenya	Mazingira Green Party	Extraparliamentary opposition		
Madagascar	Madagascar Green Party	Unknown		
Mali	Parti Ecologiste du Mali	Unknown		
Mauritius	Les Verts Fraternels	Extraparliamentary opposition		In coalition 2005–10.
Morocco	Les Verts	Unknown		
Mozambique	Ecological Party of Mozambique	Extraparliamentary opposition	Extraparliamentary opposition	
Niger	Rassemblement pour un Sahel Vert	Unknown	Unknown	
Nigeria	Green Party of Nigeria	Unknown	Unknown	
Rwanda	Democratic Green Party of Rwanda	In opposition	Unknown	
Senegal	Les Verts	Extraparliamentary opposition	Unknown	Represented in parliament between 2007 and 2012
Sierra Leone	Sierra Leone Green Party	Unknown	Unknown	
Somalia	Democratic Green Party of Somalia	Unknown	Unknown	
South Africa	South African Green Alliance	Unknown	Unknown	
Togo	Afrique Togo Ecologie	Unknown	Unknown	
Tunisia	Tunisie Verte	Extraparliamentary opposition	Unknown	
Uganda	Ecological Party of Uganda	Unknown	Unknown	
Zambia	National Revolution Green Party Zambia	Unknown	Unknown	

=== Europe ===
Affiliated members in Europe form the European Green Party.

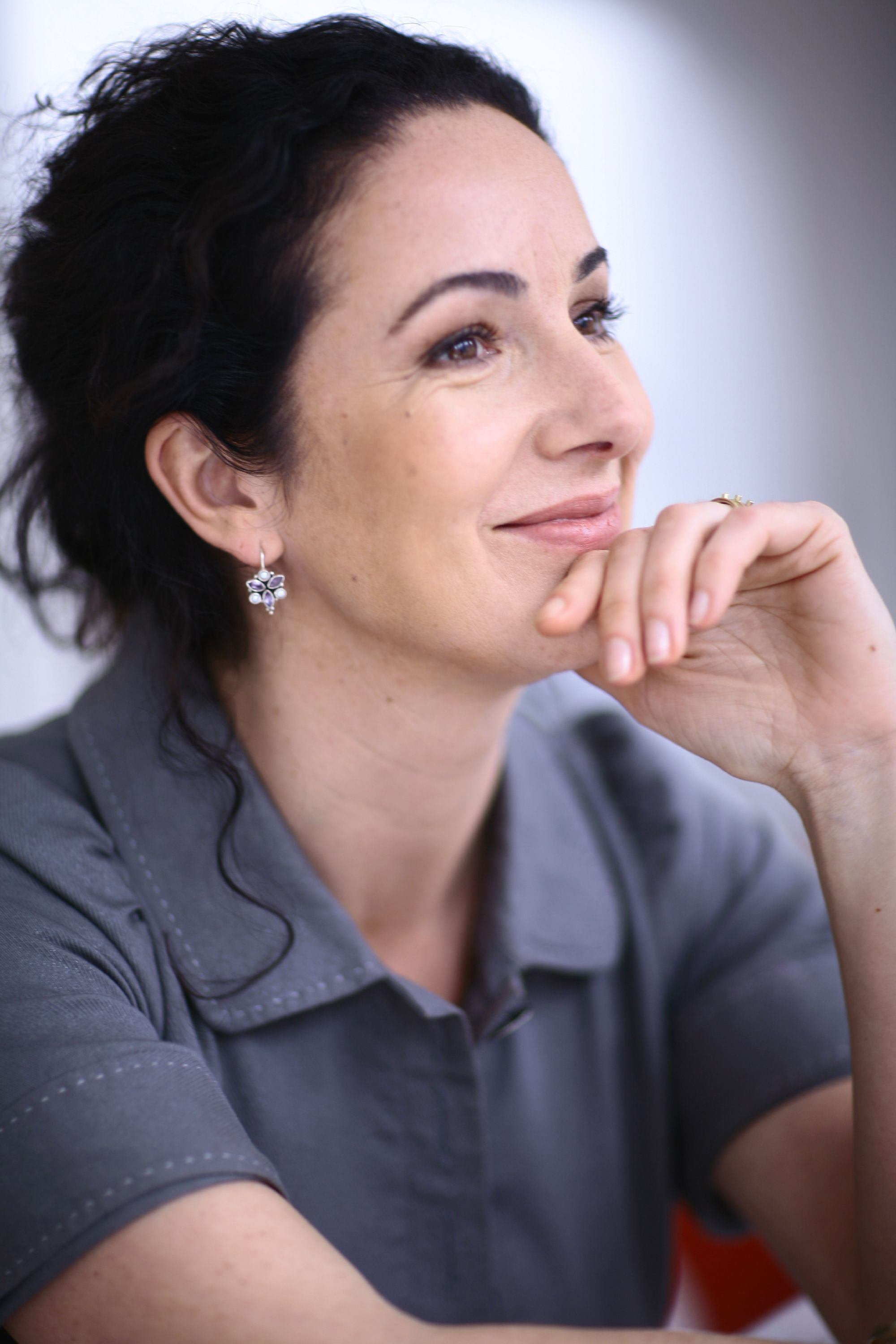
Femke Halsema, 2010; mayor of Amsterdam since 2018

Country	Name	National Government	Regional or Local Government	European Parliament	Notes
Albania	Green Party of Albania	Extraparliamentary opposition	in opposition 34 local councillors, 8 in urban municipalities and 26 in rural municipalities	Not an EU member	
Andorra	Partit Verds d'Andorra	Extraparliamentary opposition	The party hasn't participated in recent local elections	Not an EU member	
Austria	Die Grünen	In opposition	in coalition in Burgenland, represented in every state except Carinthia	In opposition	
Belgium	Ecolo	In opposition	In opposition	In opposition	Form one Parliamentary group in the Federal Parliament
Belgium	Groen	In opposition	In opposition in Flanders	In opposition	Form one Parliamentary group in the Federal Parliament
Bulgaria	Zelena Partija	Extraparliamentary opposition	Unknown	Extraparliamentary opposition	
Cyprus	Movement of Ecologists – Citizens' Cooperation	In opposition	Unknown	Extraparliamentary opposition	
Czech Republic	Strana zelených	In opposition	Represented in Regional Councils	Extraparliamentary opposition	In coalition 2007–2010, typically runs alongside Czech Pirate Party
Estonia	Estonian Greens	Extraparliamentary opposition	2 local government seats out of the nationwide 1717, both in Antsla.	Extraparliamentary opposition	
Finland	Vihreä liitto/Gröna förbundet/Ruoná lihttu	In opposition	Represented in several municipalities. It has the second largest group of councillors in Helsinki	In opposition	In coalition 1995–2003, 2007–2014, 2019–2023
France	Les Écologistes – Europe Écologie–Les Verts	In opposition	Senior coalition partner in Grenoble and Lyon. Also in coalition in Occitanie, Nouvelle-Aquitaine, Centre-Val de Loire and Paris, Nantes, Rennes.	In opposition	In coalition 1997–2002, 2012–14, represented in parliament 1997–2017, 2022-present
Georgia	Sakartvelo's Mtsvaneta Partia/Green Party of Georgia	Extraparliamentary opposition	Unknown	Not an EU member	
Germany	Bündnis '90/Die Grünen	In opposition	Senior coalition partner in the Landtag of Baden-Württemberg, also junior coalition party in 5 of 16 states. Senior coalition partner in the cities of Stuttgart, Darmstadt, Freiburg im Breisgau, Aachen and Heidelberg	In opposition	in coalition 1998–2005, 2021-2025
Greece	Ecologoi Prasinoi/Ecologist Greens	Extraparliamentary opposition	Represented in 4/13 Regional Councils	Extraparliamentary opposition	
Hungary	Lehet Más a Politika	In opposition	54 seats in local city councils	In opposition	
Ireland; United Kingdom (NI)	Green Party/Comhaontas Glas	In opposition	44 councillors in ROI local government, 7 in NI local government	2 MEPs	In coalition in ROI 2007–2011, 2020–present
Italy	Green Europe	In opposition	Junior member of the governing coalition in Emilia-Romagna, Campania and Sardinia	Extraparliamentary opposition	
Italy	Verdi–Grüne–Vërc	Extraparliamentary opposition	The party has 3 members in the Landtag of South Tyrol.	Extraparliamentary opposition	Part of the Federazione dei Verdi before 2013
Luxembourg	Déi Gréng	In opposition	Christiane Brassel-Rausch, a green, is mayor of Differdange	In opposition	
Malta	AD+PD	Extraparliamentary opposition		Extraparliamentary opposition	
Moldova	Partidul Ecologist "Alianța Verde" din Moldova	Extraparliamentary opposition	Unknown	Not an EU member	
Netherlands	De Groenen	Extraparliamentary opposition	1 of 26 seats in the water board of Amstel, Gooi en Vecht	Extraparliamentary opposition	
Netherlands	GroenLinks	In opposition	Senior coalition partner in North Holland, Groningen and Utrecht; junior partner in five other provinces. It is represented in most municipalities, it has the largest group of councillors in Nijmegen, Utrecht, Groningen and Amsterdam and is the senior government party there. It has 9 of 316 mayors, including Femke Halsema of Amsterdam.	In opposition	
North Macedonia	Demokratska Obnova na Makedonija	In opposition	Unknown	Not an EU member	
Norway	Miljøpartiet De Grønne	In opposition	Represented in the larger cities	In opposition	
Poland	Partia Zieloni	Junior party in coalition	Represented in the regional parliaments of Silesia and West Pomerania, and the city councils of Warsaw and Opole	Extraparliamentary opposition	
Portugal	Partido Ecologista Os Verdes	Extraparliamentary opposition	in coalition in some municipalities (with Portuguese Communist Party)	Extraparliamentary opposition	
Romania	Green Party of Romania	Extraparliamentary opposition	2 mayor, 5 deputy-mayor, 117 local council member	Extraparliamentary opposition	
Russia	Zelenaya Alternativa (GROZA)	Unknown	Unknown	Not an EU member	
Scotland	Scottish Green Party	In opposition	The party has 35 councillors across Scotland most notably 10 in Edinburgh and 11 in Glasgow	Not an EU member	
Slovakia	Strana Zelených	Extraparliamentary opposition	Unknown	Extraparliamentary opposition	Represented in parliament between 1990 and 2002
Slovenia	Stranka mladih Slovenije/Youth Party of Slovenia	Extraparliamentary opposition	Unknown	Extraparliamentary opposition	
Spain	Equo	Junior party in coalition	In coalition in Madrid, Valencia and Barcelona	In opposition. Inside Sumar coalition	In coalition 2023-present
Spain Catalonia	Esquerra Verda	Junior party in coalition	In coalition in Barcelona	In opposition. Inside Sumar coalition	In coalition 2023-present
Sweden	Miljöpartiet de Gröna	In opposition	Represented in 168 of 290 municipalities, especially those in urban areas.	In opposition	In coalition 2014-2021
Switzerland	Green Party of Switzerland	In opposition	Junior party in coalition cabinet in 7 cantons. Also in coalition in Bern, Geneva, Zurich, or Basel-City.	Not an EU member	
Turkey	Green Left Party	Extraparliamentary opposition	Unknown	Not an EU member	The party works inside HDP
Ukraine	Partija Zelenych Ukrajiny/Party of Greens of Ukraine	Extraparliamentary opposition	Unknown	Not an EU member	
United Kingdom (England and Wales)	Green Party of England and Wales	The party is represented in parliament by five MPs and two life peers	The party has over 1300 councillors in English and Welsh councils, and has majority control in Mid Suffolk, as well as being in coalition in several other councils. It also has 3 London AMs.	Not an EU member	The party dominated the Brighton and Hove City Council between 2011 and 2015.

=== Observers and associate member parties ===
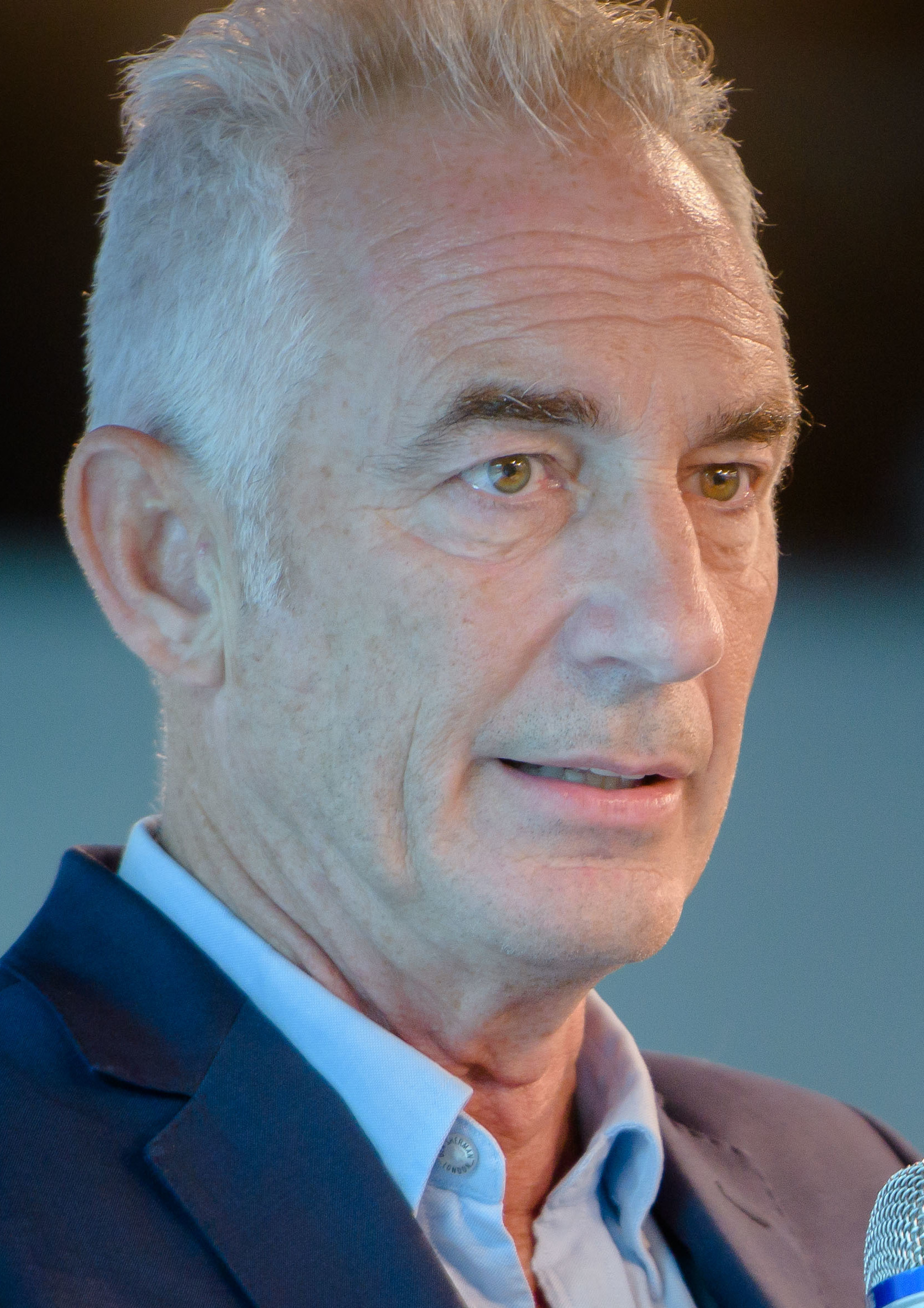
Tim Jackson, author of Prosperity Without Growth

Country	Name	Government	Notes
Belarus	Belarusian Party "The Greens"	Extraparliamentary opposition	
Bulgaria	Zelenite/The Greens	Extraparliamentary opposition	
Costa Rica	Cartago Green Party	Extraparliamentary opposition	Represented at the local level
Denmark	Socialistisk Folkeparti	Parliamentary support	In coalition 2011–14 and 2026-...
Dominican Republic	Partido Verde Dominicano	Extraparliamentary opposition	
French Guiana	Les Verts de Guyane	Extraparliamentary opposition	
Guatemala	Partido Los Verdes de Guatemala	Unknown	
Indonesia	Atjeh Green Party	Extraparliamentary opposition	
Indonesia	Indonesian Green Party	Extraparliamentary opposition	
Nepal	Hariyali Nepal Party	Extraparliamentary opposition	
Nicaragua	Verdes en Alianza	Unknown	
Philippines	Philippines Greens	Unknown	
Russia	Green Russia	Extraparliamentary opposition	
Serbia	Zeleni Srbije/Greens of Serbia	Junior party in coalition	
Sri Lanka	Sri Lanka Green Alliance	Extraparliamentary opposition	

== See also ==
- Outline of green politics
- Conservation movement
- Direct democracy
- Environmental movement
- Grassroots democracy
- List of environmental organizations
- Participatory democracy
