= Green Mountain Party =

Green Mountain Party may refer to:

- a Vermont political party founded in 2015. In 2018 party chairman Neil Johnson came in last with 385 votes for the Washington-7 Vermont House of Representatives seat
- Green Mountain Peace and Justice Party, Vermont political party formerly known as Liberty Union Party

== See also ==
- Green Party (disambiguation)
- Mountain Party, West Virginia, affiliated with the Green Party of the United States
