= Somalia Green Party =

Political party in Somalia

Somalia Green Party Xisbiga Cagaaran Soomaaliya
- Founded: 1990
- Headquarters: Mogadishu; Jilib
- Ideology: Green politics Environmentalism
- International affiliation: Federation of Green Parties of Africa

Website
- greenparty.org.so/

The Somalia Green Party (Somali: Xisbiga Cagaaran Soomaaliya, SGP) is the local green party of Somalia. Founded in 1990. It has an environmentalist focus. The SGP is a member of the Horn of African Greens in the Federation of Green Parties of Africa, which includes the national green parties in the other Horn of Africa states of Djibouti, Eritrea, and Ethiopia.

== Headquarters ==
The association has its headquarters in Mogadishu and Jilib in southern Somalia. Plans are also in the works to open up new SGP branches in the autonomous northern Puntland and Somaliland regions, as well as the southernmost Kismayo area. Additionally, the party has its international and communications office in Ottawa, Ontario, Canada.
