= Green Initiative =

Political party in Argentina

The Green Initiative (Spanish: Iniciativa Verde) was a Green political party in Argentina, founded in 2006. It was primarily active in Buenos Aires.

On 29 November 2010 its party status expired.

== Juan Manuel Velasco ==
Velasco had previously been Minister of Environment in the Buenos Aires City Legislature. Prior to this, the Green Initiative had sought to promote environmentalist policies through alliances with other parties. Although unsuccessful as a National Congress candidate, Velasco continued to be the party's spokesperson through 2011. Nowadays is a legislator for the ARI party.

== Policies ==
Green Initiative policies included:

- Declaring Argentina a nuclear-free zone;
- Zero waste;
- Eliminating all transport subsidies;
- Reducing greenhouse gas emissions by 20% by 2020;
- Eliminating poverty through a "Zero Hunger Plan."
