= Rally of Congolese Ecologists – The Greens =

Political party in the Democratic Republic of the Congo

Rally of Congolese Ecologists-The Greens Rassemblement des Écologistes Congolais-Les Verts
- Founded: 15 June 2001
- Ideology: Green politics
- Regional affiliation: Federation of Green Parties of Africa (Observer)
- International affiliation: Global Greens

The Rally of Congolese Ecologist-The Greens (abbreviated REC- LES VERTS; French: Rassemblement des Écologistes Congolais, les verts) was a Green party in the Democratic Republic of the Congo. It was founded by Faustin Kiembwa Tabena on June 15, 2001.

In the 2006 general elections, the party gained one of the 500 seats in the National Assembly. Mpaka Mawete Ruffin gained the seat of Kimvula in Bas-Congo.

== See also ==
- Conservation movement
- Environmental movement
- Green party
- Green politics
- List of environmental organizations
- Sustainability
- Sustainable development
