= Ecologist Party of Mali =

Political party in Mali

Ecologist Party of Mali Parti Ecologiste du Mali
- Ideology: Green politics
- Regional affiliation: Federation of Green Parties of Africa
- International affiliation: Global Greens

The Parti Ecologiste du Mali (Ecologist Party of Mali), is a green party in Mali.

== See also ==
- Conservation movement
- Environmental movement
- Green party
- Green politics
- List of environmental organizations
- Sustainability
- Sustainable development
