= India Greens Party =

Political party in India

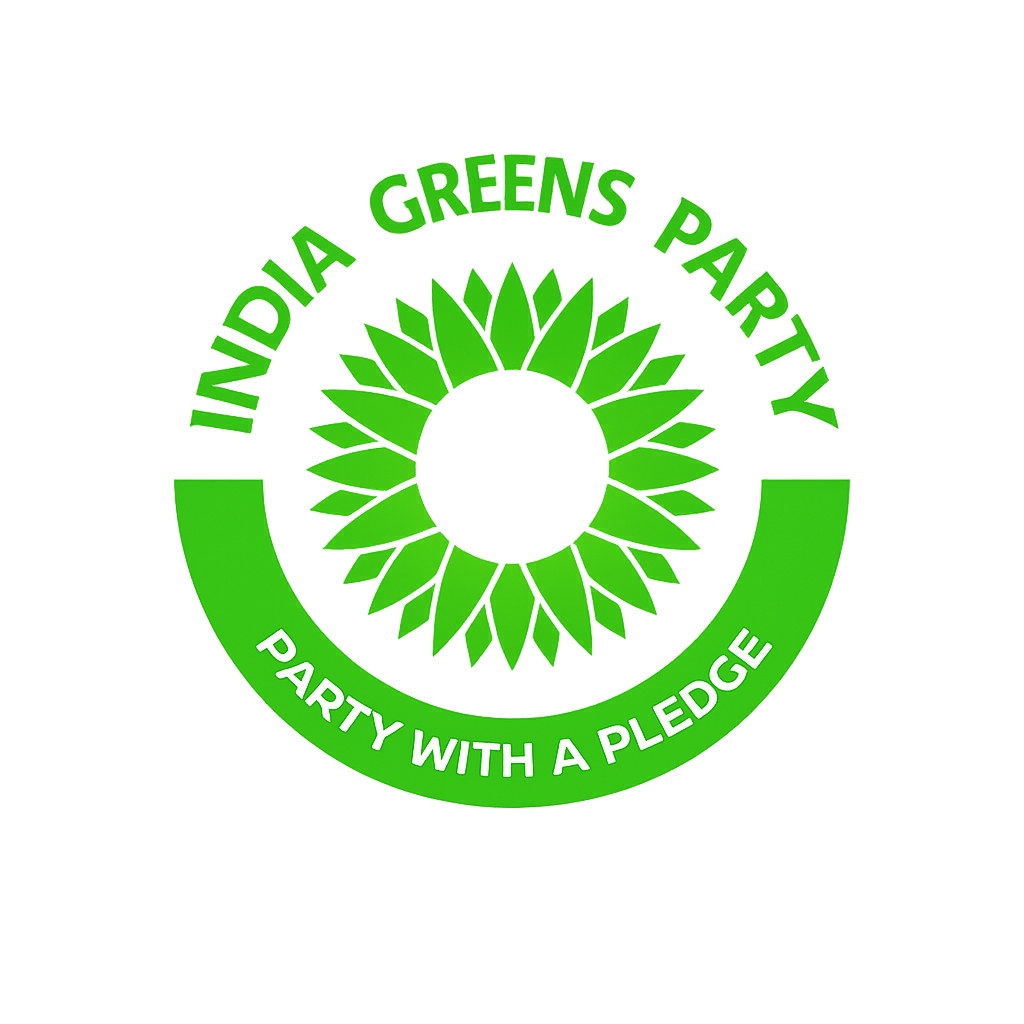
- Abbreviation: IGP
- President: Sarika Dabral
- General Secretary: Shivani Bhatt; Subhash Dabral
- Founder: Suresh Nautiyal
- Founded: 18 November 2018 (7 years ago)
- Ideology: Green politics Ecological wisdom Eco-socialism; Social justice
- Political position: Centre-left

India Greens Party is a green political party in India. It is one of the few green parties in India to have registration under Election Commission of India and the only national-level environmentalist organisation in India to become the member of Global Greens. It was founded by Suresh Nautiyal, a member of Global Greens Coordination.

== Background ==
The India Greens Party traces its origins to a meeting held in New Delhi on 2 July 2017, attended by 44 participants from 17 states and union territories, including Irom Sharmila Chanu, political activist from Manipur. The participants discussed the possibility of forming a national-level Green Party in India in the context of issues such as globalisation, liberalisation, marketisation, global warming, and climate change. The meeting also noted that previous attempts to establish a pan-Indian Green Party had not succeeded.

The party held its first National Convention and National Council meeting on 17–18 November 2018 at Garhwal Bhavan in New Delhi. During the meeting, the party adopted its preamble, constitution, core principles, policies, and ideological framework, which it states were based on the principles of the Global Greens Charter and green philosophy. On 18 November 2018, the party elected its first National Executive Committee, headed by Suresh Nautiyal as founding president. The party regards 18 November 2018 as the date of its formal establishment and observes it annually as its Foundation Day.

== Electoral performance ==
Election Year	Leader	Seats contested	Seats won	+/- in seats	Overall votes	% of overall votes	+/- in vote share	Sitting side
Lok sabha
2024	Suresh Nautiyal	3	0	Steady	2,387		▲	Steady
