= Civil United Green Alternative =

- Founded: 1991
- Ideology: Green politics
- European affiliation: European Green Party (Associate)
- International affiliation: Global Greens

The Civil United Green Alternative movement (Russian: движение Гражданская Объединённая Зелёная Альтернатива), GROZA movement (Russian: движение ГРОЗА, lit. "Thunderstorm"), formerly Interregional Green Party, is a Russian movement, founded in 1991 as a local party in Leningrad. In 2005, it reorganized in the green political movement "Green Alternative" (GROZA). The movement is an associate member of the European Green Party.

== See also ==
- Green party
- Green politics
- List of environmental organizations
- Russian Ecological Party "The Greens" (former KEDR Party)
- Union of Greens of Russia
- Green Alliance (Russia) (political party founded in 2012)
