= Rally of the Ecologists of Senegal =

Political party in Senegal

- Founded: 1999
- Ideology: Green politics
- International affiliation: Global greens

The Rally of the Ecologists of Senegal (Rassemblement des écologistes du Sénégal – Les Verts) is a political party in Senegal. At the legislative elections of 3 June 2007, the party won 1.00% of the popular vote and 1 out of 150 seats.

== See also ==
- Conservation movement
- Environmental movement
- Green party
- Green politics
- List of environmental organizations
- Sustainability
- Sustainable development
