= Union of Greens of Russia =

Defunct green political party in Russia (2005–2006)

Union of Greens of Russia Союз зелёных России
- Abbreviation: UGR (English); SZR (Russian)
- Leader: Alexey Yablokov
- Founded: 4 March 2004
- Dissolved: 11 June 2006
- Merged into: Yabloko
- Headquarters: Moscow, Russia
- Ideology: Green politics Environmentalism; Civil rights
- Political position: Centre-left
- European affiliation: European Greens
- Colours: Green

Website
- rusgreen.ru

The Union of Greens of Russia (UGR; Russian: Союз зелёных России; СЗР; Soyuz zelonykh Rossii, SZR) or Green Russia (Russian: Зелёная Россия; Zelonaya Rossiya) was a political party in Russia that was active from 2005 until 2006.

In 2005, the organization was founded as an independent party, but in 2006, it merged with the party Yabloko as an ecological faction "Green Russia". The "Union of Greens of Russia" and the faction "Green Russia" of Yabloko were headed by professor Alexey Yablokov, the founder of Greenpeace USSR in the 1980s.

The faction "Green Russia" is an associate member of the European Green Party.

== Merger and later status ==
After joining Yabloko in 2006, the movement continued as the party’s Green Russia faction. The faction has participated in European green networks and holds associate member status in the European Green Party.

== See also ==
- Green party
- Green politics
- List of environmental organizations
- Civil United Green Alternative
- Russian Ecological Party "The Greens" (former KEDR Party)
- Alliance of Greens – The People's Party (political party founded in 2012)
