= Green Party of Fiji =

- Founded: 2008
- Ideology: Green politics Ecological wisdom Social justice Pacifism; Participatory democracy
- Political position: Left-wing

The Green Party of Fiji was a political party in Fiji. The party was formed in November 2008 by former interim regime Cabinet Minister Bernadette Ganilau. Like other green parties, the party followed principles of "ecological wisdom, social justice and non-violence, participatory democracy and sustainability".

The party was registered with the Fiji Elections Office.

In January 2013 the military-backed regime promulgated new regulations governing the registration of political parties, requiring all parties to have at least 5,000 members. All existing parties had to re-register under the new regulations. The party was not one of the two to re-register, and as a result was wound up and its assets forfeited to the state.
