= Egyptian Green Party =

Egyptian Green Party حزب الخضر Hizb Al-khodr
- Chairman: Khaled Goshen
- Founded: 1990
- Headquarters: 82 Wadi El Nil Street, Meat Okaba, El Giza, Floor 4
- Ideology: Green politics
- Regional affiliation: Federation of Green Parties of Africa
- International affiliation: Global Greens
- House of Representatives: 0 / 568

The Green Party of Egypt (Hizb Al-khodr) is a Green political party in Egypt. The party presses for protection and promotion of the ecological system and optimal use of resources. It also calls for drawing up solutions to the problems of poverty, underdevelopment, and challenges the disadvantages of globalism and capitalism.

== History ==
It was founded by former diplomat Hassan Ragab in 1990, experienced a hiatus in 1995, and was revived in 1998. In the internal party elections in 2000 Dr. Abdel Munem Ali Ali Al Aasar was elected president of the Green Party. He was later appointed to the Shura Council (the upper House of Egypt's parliament). However, political activities became increasingly difficult in the final years of the Mubarak regime and the party remained ineffective.

There was a revival in the aftermath of the Arab Spring in 2011, and the party fielded candidates in the 2012 elections. The party is currently a member of the Global Greens and the African Greens.
