= Ecologist Party for the Development of Burkina =

Political party in Burkina Faso

Ecologist Party for the Development of Burkina Parti Écologiste pour le Développement du Burkina
- Founded: 2003
- Ideology: Green politics
- Regional affiliation: Federation of Green Parties of Africa (Observer)
- International affiliation: Global Greens

The Ecological Party for the Development of Burkina (French: Parti Écologiste pour le Développement du Burkina, PEDB) is a political party in Burkina Faso (former Upper Volta) founded in 2003.

The president of the PEDB was Yacouba Touré. The party is a member of the Federation of Green Parties of Africa/Partis Verts de la Fédération en Afrique.
