= Rally of the Ecologists of Burkina =

Political party in Burkina Faso

Rally of the Ecologists of Burkina Rassemblement des Écologistes du Burkina
- Founded: 2000s
- Dissolved: 29 January 2026 (54 days)
- Ideology: Green politics
- International affiliation: Global greens

The Rally of the Ecologists of Burkina (French: Rassemblement des Écologistes du Burkina, RDEB) was a political party in Burkina Faso.

On 29 January 2026, all parties, including this one, were dissolved through decree by the junta government in Burkina Faso.

== Background ==
RDEB candidate Ram Ouédraogo ran in the 13 November 2005 presidential election, placing 5th out of 13 candidates with 2.04% of the vote.

== See also ==
- Green party
- Green politics
