= Papua New Guinea Greens =

Papua New Guinea Greens Party
- President: Wan Wak
- Secretary: Andrew Kutapae
- Treasurer: Jackrey Engas
- Special Advisor: Dorothy Tekwie
- Founded: 2001
- Youth wing: Jack Lyakundi
- Women Wing: Margret Yanda
- Highlands: John Horaki
- Southern: Sep Galeva
- Ideology: Green politics Environmentalism; Participatory democracy
- International affiliation: Global Greens; Asia-Pacific Green Network
- Colours: Green
- Momase: Jacob Nalu
- NGI: Thomas Buka
- MPs in the National Parliament: 1 / 118

Website
- www.pnggreensparty.org.pg

The Papua New Guinea Greens Party or PNG Greens are a minor political party in Papua New Guinea. Founded in 2001, the party took part in the 2002, 2007, 2012 and 2017 general elections, without winning a seat. They are a member of the Global Greens and of the Asia Pacific Greens Federation.

Per its constitution, the party campaigns for environmentally sustainable development, participatory democracy, an "equitable distribution of social and natural resources […] to meet basic human needs unconditionally", and respect for "cultural, linguistic, ethnic, sexual, religious and spiritual diversity within the context of individual responsibility toward all beings".

In the 2012 general election, the party was led by Dorothy Tekwie and stood twenty-five candidates, of whom ten were women, in a country where women remain vastly under-represented in politics. None were elected. Tekwie herself unsuccessfully stood against incumbent Deputy Prime Minister Belden Namah in the Vanimo-Green River constituency.

== Policies ==
The Papua New Guinea Greens Party firstly state that they will uphold the objectives within their constitution, and integrate them into the legislative system of Papua New Guinea should they be elected. Their main principles are those of sustainable living, high education levels, supporting the ecosystem, upholding human rights and increasing fair democracy within PNG.

The PNG Greens agree with Vision 2050 aims, although emphasise the need for sustainability to be a main goal globally. PNG Greens support policies to mitigate environmental pollution of rivers, lakes, and marine areas.

== Constitution ==
=== Motto ===
The motto of the PNG Greens is "Changing the way the world communicates."

=== Other terms ===
The constitution also contains terms of voting on policy, membership, funding, parliamentary representation, by-laws, and a variety of other topics.

== Electoral representation ==
In 2012, the PNG Greens Party put forward candidates in many areas, notably in Madang province, where the party endorsed candidates for all of the seven seats.
