= Pakistan Green Party =

Pakistan Green Party پاکستان گرین پارٹی
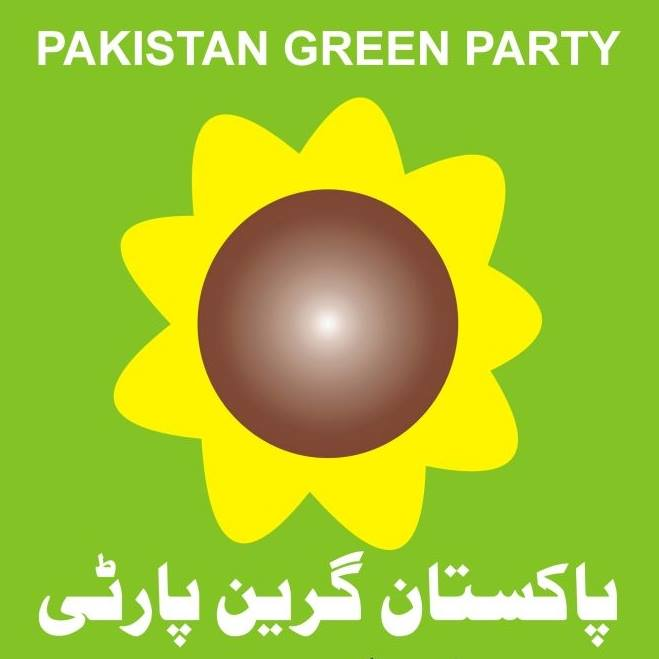
- Chairman: Liaquat Ali Shaikh
- Secretary-General: Muhammad Gulfam
- Karachi Division Leader: Faheem Ahmed Khan
- Larkana Division Leader: Muhammad Khurusheed
- Youth Leader: Saima Gul
- Founded: 28 April 2002
- Youth wing: Pakistan Young Greens
- Ideology: Green politics Grassroots democracy Multiculturalism
- Regional affiliation: Asia Pacific Greens Federation
- International affiliation: Global Greens
- Colors: Green and Yellow
- Slogan: "Politics for the next generation"
- Senate: 0 / 100
- National Assembly: Assembly dissolved

Election symbol
- Sunflower

Party flag

Website
- www.pakistangreenparty.org

The Pakistan Green Party (Urdu: پاکستان گرین پارٹی), also known as the Pakistan Greens, is a green political party in Pakistan. It was founded on 28 April 2002, and is currently led by Liaquat Ali Shaikh.

== Platform ==
The ten basic values, or policy positions of the Pakistan Greens, are similar to the ten principles of other green parties:

- Grassroots democracy
- Social justice and equal opportunity
- Ecological wisdom (ecosophy)
- Non-violence
- Decentralization of authority from Power to the People
- Community-based economics and economic justice
- Gender equity
- Respect for diversity
- Personal and global responsibility
- Sustainability
