= Cartago Green Party =

Cartago Green Party Partido Verde de Cartago
- President: Rodrigo José Arias Gutiérrez
- Secretary-General: Sergio Solano Bonilla
- Founded: November 11, 2004
- Dissolved: April 30, 2024
- Ideology: Green politics
- International affiliation: Global Greens (Associate)
- Colors: Green

Party flag

The Green Party of Cartago (Spanish: Partido Verde de Cartago; originally named the Green Ecological Party) was a provincial political party in Cartago, Costa Rica. The party follows environmentalist ideas and platforms and is a member of both the Global Greens and the Federation of Green Parties of the Americas. The party also received the endorsement of Costa Rica’s Greenpeace local branch.

The party was founded in September 2004 by journalist Carlos Arrieta and English teacher Rodrigo Arias, among others. The party’s leaders acknowledged that some of the major parties, like Citizens Action, have endorsed environmentalist policies in Congress and opposed projects damaging to the environment, but still espoused the need for a specific ecological party in the Assembly. With Arrieta as nominee to Congress, the party obtained 1,604 votes in 2006 and 2,901 in 2010 with no seats earned. Its best results came during the 2016 municipal elections when it received strong support in Paraíso canton, earning a seat in the Municipal Council and the Syndic position of the central district. It has remained inactive since its founder's death in 2020.
