= Atjeh Green Party =

Atjeh Green Party Partai Atjeh Hijau
- Abbreviation: PAH
- Founded: 2013; 13 years ago
- Ideology: Pancasila; Green politics Progressivism
- Political position: Centre-left
- International affiliation: Global Greens (Observer)
- DPRD I seats: 0 / 81
- DPRD II seats: 0 / 665

Website
- https://www.instagram.com/partaiatjehhijau?igsh=NDBtMzk4MTV4ZXlm (Instagram)

The Atjeh Green Party (Indonesian: Partai Atjeh Hijau, PAH), also known as the Aceh Greens, is a regional political party in Aceh, Indonesia, that was founded in 2013.

The Atjeh Greens is active and established in seven districts and cities. According to Fahmi Cherly, the party seeks to be registered by the 2024 election.

The Atjeh Greens have been supported by the Australian Greens as a part of the "Australian Political Parties for Democracy Program".
