= Ecologist Green Party of Nicaragua =

Ecologists Green Party of Nicaragua
- Founded: 2003
- Ideology: Green politics
- International affiliation: Global Greens (Associate)

The Ecologist Green Party of Nicaragua (in Spanish: Partido Verde Ecologista de Nicaragua, PVEN) is a political party in Nicaragua. It was founded in Managua on November 23, 2003. The president of the organisation is Edward Martín Salazar Cruz. Since 2003, the PVEN is a full member of the Federation of the Green Parties of the Americas (Federación de los Partidos Verdes de las Américas).

On May 9, 2006, the PVEN signed an alliance with the Sandinista Renovation Movement and became part of the Alianza Herty 2006, running in the MRS ticket in the 2006 Nicaraguan general election.
