= Global Greens Charter =

Global charter for Green political principles

The Global Greens Charter is a document that 800 delegates from the Green parties of 72 countries decided upon a first gathering of the Global Greens in Canberra, Australia in April 2001. The first part contains six guiding principles, whereas the second part specifies what political action should be taken. The second part of the charter was modified in Dakar, Senegal in 2012 at the third Global Greens Congress.

The Charter was updated in 2017 Congress in Liverpool and in the 2023 Congress in Korea.

The signatory parties and political movements of the Global Greens Charter commit themselves to global partnership and to six guiding principles. These principles are:

- ecological wisdom
- social justice
- participatory democracy
- nonviolence
- sustainability
- respect for diversity

The Charter builds on earlier Greens statements including in 1992 at the Rio Earth Summit, the Millennium Declaration made at Oaxaca in 1999 and the Accord between the Green Parties of the Americas and the Ecologist Parties of Africa.

== Guiding documents ==
The draft Charter was prepared by Louise Crossley, a member of the Australian Greens, based upon the following documents.

- Ten Key Values of the Green Committees of Correspondence (US)
- Taiwanese interpretation of the Ten Key Values
- Ten Key Values of the Canadian Greens
- The Earth Charter - Benchmark Draft II, April 1999
- Declaracion de principios (Mexico)
- Valores fundamentais (Brazil)
- Guiding principles, including the Four Pillars of the European Greens
- Protocol between the African and American Green Party Federations
- Charter of The Green Party of Aotearoa New Zealand
- Charter of The Australian Greens
- United Tasmania Group - The 'New Ethic' (1972)
- Beyond tomorrow - Values Party manifesto (1975)
