= Uganda Green Party =

Political party in Uganda

Green Partisan Party
- Leader: Mr. Sentongo Muzafalu
- Founded: 2010
- Headquarters: P.O. Box 35596, Kampala Opposite Freedom City, Namasuba Town

The Uganda Green Party is a green political party in Uganda. The party claims to be committed to the well-being of the natural environment rather than to politics. Its main objective is to protect the environment and its habitats.

== See also ==
- Conservation movement
- Environmental movement
- Green politics
- List of environmental organizations
- Sustainability
- Sustainable development
- The Green revolution
