= Green Tunisia Party =

Tunisian political party

Green Tunisia Party تونس الخضراء
- French name: Parti Tunisie verte
- Secretary-General: Abdelkader Zitouni
- Founded: 19 April 2004
- Legalized: 17 January 2011
- Ideology: Green politics
- Political position: Centre-left to left-wing
- International affiliation: Global Greens

The Green Tunisia Party (Arabic: تونس الخضراء; French: Parti Tunisie Verte), is a Green political party in Tunisia. Legalized only since the Tunisian Revolution in 2011, it participated in the Popular Front coalition until 2014.

== History ==
Founded in 2004 by Abdelkader Zitouni, the party remained illegal under the rule of Zine El Abidine Ben Ali, instead being countered by the newly founded bloc party Green Party for Progress. During this time, it was however internationally recognized by the European Green Party and the Global Greens.

The party was one of the three political parties legalized on 17 January 2011. Green Tunisia participated in the foundation of left-wing Popular Front coalition in 2012, but left on 16 May 2014, denouncing the hegemony of Workers' Party leader Hamma Hammami.
