= Green Party of Iraq =

- Founded: 2003
- Ideology: Green politics Social justice Progressivism; Secularism
- Political position: Centre-left
- International affiliation: Global Greens

Website
- https://iraqigreens.net/

The Green Party of Iraq (Arabic: حزب الخضر العراقي) was created in 2003 and is dedicated to build an Iraq that is committed to "democracy, justice, and freedom" and one that respects equal rights for all Iraqis, irrespective of "religion, sect, or ethnicity". The political party does not have any elected members in the Council of Representatives of Iraq.

In 2024, it is a member of Global Greens.

== Platform ==
The Green Party of Iraqi has sixteen core values, similar to the Global Greens ten key values.

- 1. Democracy.
- 2. Unity of Iraq.
- 3. Constitution committed to justice and equality for all.
- 4. Free and Just Multi-Party Elections.
- 5. Protecting Islam, while respecting religious freedom.
- 6. Economy that provides for a dignified life.
- 9. Army and the Armed Forces that follows civilian and constitutional law.
- 10. Right Medicare, Social and Educational Welfare.
- 11. Respect for Iraqi diverse Culture and National Heritage.
- 12. Respect for Kurdish and Ethnic Minority Rights.
- 13. Respect for Farmers and Workers Rights.
- 14. Respect for Human rights and punishment for those that violate these rights.
- 15. Freedom of the Press, Publication and Information.
