= Green Party of Lebanon =

Lebanese political party

Green Party of Lebanon حزب الخضر اللبناني
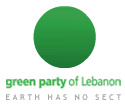
- Abbreviation: GPL
- Leader: Fadi Abi Allam
- General Secretary: Rita Boustany
- Founded: August 20, 2008
- Headquarters: Beirut
- Ideology: Green politics

Website
- https://greenpartyoflebanon.org/

The Green Party of Lebanon (Arabic: حزب الخضر اللبناني, romanized: ĥizb-al-khodor-al-lubnanī) is a Lebanese green political party. Founded in August 2008, the Green Party advocates environmental protection, sustainable development, and human rights in Lebanon. It is the first Lebanese party to focus primarily on Green politics.

== History ==
Environmental concerns in Lebanon have been overshadowed by the sectarian nepotist political system and consigned to the bottom of the political agenda. This is despite the fact that Lebanon's tourism industry - a key part of its economy - relies heavily on the green spaces and woodlands that distinguish Lebanon from neighboring countries.

The Green Party of Lebanon was founded on 20 August 2008 at a conference in Beirut's Monroe Hotel. The three-hour conference, which assembled 65 members of the Lebanese elite, presented the party's charter and political and economic work plan followed by the election of its 20-member executive board. The executive board elected Philip Skaf, chief executive and creative officer at Grey Worldwide MENA, an advertising agency, as party president.

In March 2009, the Green Party declared a state of environmental emergency and announced the launching of an "environmental pact". Skaf declared that the party would not run candidates in the 2009 Lebanese general election but stressed that the document would be presented to all Lebanese political parties for them to adopt its goals.

== Members ==
Name	Title
Fadi Abi Allam	President
Mohammad Al-khawli	Vice President
Rita Boustany	General Secretary
Political Affairs
Imad Fahat	Treasurer
Najah Jaroush	International Affairs
Vanda Chedid	Women Affairs
Rita Boustany	Environmental and Municipal Affairs

Other Members

- Mohamad Al Khawli
- Fadi Chaar
- Fouad Chaya
- Navia Fahd
- Joanna Jurdi
- Rony Kfoury
- Raymond Harb
- Nidal Chebli
- Nada Zaarour
- Hanna Mrad
- Georges Labaki
- Fouad Zwein
