= Green party =

Political party based on green politics

Map of member parties of the Global Greens

A green party is a formally organized political party based on the principles of green politics, such as environmentalism and social justice.

Green party platforms typically embrace social democratic economic policies and form coalitions with other left-wing parties.

Green parties exist in nearly 90 countries around the world, many of which are members of Global Greens.

== Definitions ==
There are distinctions between "green" parties and "Green" parties. Any party, faction, or politician may be labeled "green" if it emphasizes environmental causes. In contrast, formally organized Green parties may follow an ideology that includes not only environmentalism, but often also other concerns such as social justice and consensus decision-making. The Global Greens Charter lists six guiding principles which are ecological wisdom, social justice, participatory democracy, nonviolence, sustainability and respect for diversity.

== History ==
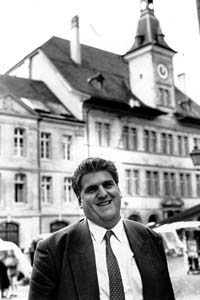
In 1979, Daniel Brélaz became the world's first green member of a national parliament (in Switzerland).

Political parties campaigning on a predominantly environmental platform arose in the early 1970s in various parts of the world.

The world's first political parties to campaign on a predominantly environmental platform were the United Tasmania Group, which contested the April 1972 state election in Tasmania, Australia, and the Values Party of New Zealand, which contested the November 1972 New Zealand general election. Their use of the name 'Green' derived from the 'Green Bans': an Australian movement of building workers who refused to build on sites of cultural and environmental significance.

The first green party in Europe was the Popular Movement for the Environment, founded in 1972 in the Swiss canton of Neuchâtel. The first national green party in Europe was PEOPLE, founded in Britain in February 1973, which eventually turned into the Ecology Party and then the Green Party. Several other local political groups were founded in the beginning of the 1970s. Fons Sprangers was probably the first Green mayor in the world, elected in 1970 in Meer, and active until 2020 for the Flemish Greens. The first political party to use the name "Green" seems to have been the Lower Saxon "Green List for Environmental Protection", founded on 1 September 1977.

The first Green Party to achieve national prominence was the German Green Party, famous for their opposition to nuclear power, as well as an expression of anti-centralist and pacifist values traditional to greens. They were founded in 1980 and have been in coalition governments at state level for some years. They were in federal government with the Social Democratic Party of Germany in a so-called Red-Green alliance from 1998 to 2005. In 2001, they reached an agreement to end reliance on nuclear power in Germany, and agreed to remain in coalition and support the government of Chancellor Gerhard Schröder in the 2001 Afghan War. This put them at odds with many Greens worldwide.

In Finland, in 1995, the Finnish Green Party was the first European Green party to be part of a national Cabinet. Other Green parties that have participated in government at national level include the Groen! (formerly Agalev) and Ecolo in Belgium, The Greens in France and the Green Party in Ireland. In the Netherlands GroenLinks ("GreenLeft") was founded in 1990 from four small left-wing parties and is now a stable faction in the Dutch parliament. The Australian Greens supported a Labor minority government from 2010 to 2013, and have participated in several state governments.

In 2022 Denmark, the Green Party The Alternative has only one Parliament member, having dropped from the previous nine, and five local parliaments members. In 2022 Portugal, the Green Party People-Animals-Nature also has only one Parliament member, having dropped from the previous four, and another in the Madeira Regional Parliament, while its two other Green parties, Partido da Terra and Partido Ecologista "Os Verdes", only have, respectively, two councilpeople and one mayor.

Around the world, individuals have formed many Green parties over the last thirty years. Green parties now exist in most countries with democratic systems, from Canada to Peru, from Norway to South Africa, from Ireland to Mongolia. There is Green representation at national, regional and local levels in many countries around the world.

Most of the Green parties are formed to win elections, and so organize themselves by the presented electoral or political districts. But that does not apply universally: The Green Party of Alaska is organized along bioregional lines to practice bioregional democracy.

=== Support ===
Academic research has uncovered striking international consistency in the typical demographic and attitudinal profile of Green party supporters. In particular, Green voters tend to be young, highly educated, disproportionately female, and employed in the social and cultural services (healthcare, teaching, the arts, etc.), whilst also displaying above-average levels of environmentalism and social liberalism, as well as being left-leaning. Additionally, Green parties also tend to attract greater levels of support in countries defined by high levels of economic development and low levels of unemployment, as well as the presence of tangible environmental disputes (such as nuclear power production) and active major party competition on the environmental issue. The former two factors are believed to generate cohorts of voters with enough material security to devote their attention to 'higher' goals such as environmentalism; the latter two help raise the profile of the Green's own policy positions and statements (providing that the major parties do not act so quickly to the rising salience of environmentalism as to usurp the issue entirely and completely preempt the development of a separate ecological party). Their supporters sometimes blame the economical system for the environmental issues neglecting any green free-market liberal capitalist alternatives.

=== Alliances ===
Depending on local conditions or issues, platforms and alliances may vary. In line with the goal of democracy, neighboring ecoregions may require different policies or protections.

Green parties are often formed in a given jurisdiction by a coalition of scientific ecologists, community environmentalists, and local (or national) leftist groups or groups concerned with peace or citizens rights.

A Red-Green alliance is an alliance between Green parties and social democratic parties. Such alliances are typically formed for the purpose of elections (mostly in first-past-the-post election systems), or, after elections, for the purpose of forming a government.

Some Greens, such as those in Hawaii, find more effective alliances with more conservative groups (Blue-Green alliance) or indigenous peoples – who seek to prevent disruption of traditional ways of life or to save ecological resources they depend on. Although Greens find much to support in fostering these types of alliances with groups of historically different backgrounds, they also feel strongly about forming diverse communities through encouragement of diversity in social and economic demographics in communities, especially in the United States.

Alliances often highlight strategic differences between participating in parties and advancing the values of the Green movement. For example, Greens became allied with centre-right parties to oust the centre-left ruling Institutional Revolutionary Party of Mexico. Ralph Nader, the 2000 presidential nominee of the U.S. Greens, campaigned with ultra-conservative Pat Buchanan on joint issues such as farm policy and bans on corporate funding of election campaigns, although this "alliance" between Nader and Buchanan was very specifically limited to the purpose of showing that there was broad support for certain specific issues, across the political spectrum.

U.S. Greens grew dramatically throughout 2001. However, stable coalitions (such as that in Germany) tend to be formed between elections with left-wing parties on social issues, and 'the grassroots right' on such issues as irresponsible corporate subsidies and public ethics.

On 13 June 2007, the Irish Green Party, represented by six members of parliament or TDs, agreed to go into a coalition government for the first time in their history, with Fianna Fáil and the Progressive Democrats (the Progressive Democrats later dissolved as a party, though their members remained in parliament). The Green Party held two Cabinet seats, as well as two junior ministries, until their withdrawal from government in January 2011. They lost all of their six seats in the following month's general election, but won two in the 2016 general election, and twelve seats in the 2020 general election, and entered government again in June 2020.

In the Czech Republic, the Green Party was part of the governing coalition, together with the conservative Civic Democratic Party (ODS) and the Christian Democrats (KDU–ČSL) from January 2007 until the government collapsed in March 2009.

Green parties often have to join coalitions/alliances with other parties within parliament as they rarely get a large share of the vote (rarely polling above 10% at a national level). Their involvement in coalition governments is important in getting environmental issues on the political agenda, however they are often limited in the amount that they can succeed given they are not the majority within the alliance.

== Green parties ==
=== Africa ===
Some national Green parties began forming in Africa in the 1980s and 1990s, but they often struggled to gain influence.

Wangari Maathai was perhaps the most prominent and successful member of a Green party in Africa: after founding the Green Belt Movement and the Mazingira Green Party of Kenya, she was elected to the Kenyan Parliament in 2002, became an assistant minister for Environmental and Natural Resources, and won the Nobel Peace Prize in 2004. Other African Green parties that have achieved parliamentary representation include Les Verts Fraternels of Mauritius, and Frank Habineza's Democratic Green Party of Rwanda. In Senegal, Green party leader Haïdar el Ali was appointed Minister for Ecology in 2012.

=== Asia and Oceania ===
==== Australia, Fiji, New Zealand, Papua New Guinea, Vanuatu ====
Green parties have achieved national or state parliamentary representation in New Zealand, Australia and Vanuatu. In New Zealand the Green Party of Aotearoa New Zealand currently holds 15 seats in the New Zealand House of Representatives after the 2023 general election. While the Australian Greens hold 10 seats in the Australian Senate and a single seat in the Australian House of Representatives following the 2025 Australian federal election. Since 2004, they have received more votes than any other third party in every federal election. They also have representation in the upper and lower houses of state parliaments of five states and in the unicameral chamber of one territory. Greens also hold representative positions in local government across New Zealand and Australia (where a number of local government authorities are controlled by Green councillors). The Greens took the seat of Melbourne from the centre-left Australian Labor Party (ALP) in 2010 with candidate Adam Bandt. This was the first time the Greens have won a Lower House seat at a general election (although they have previously won two seats at by-elections).

Proportional representation in the Australian Senate and in New Zealand has strengthened the position of the Australian Greens and the Green Party of New Zealand and enabled them to participate directly in legislatures and policy-making committees. In countries following British-style 'first past the post' electoral rules, Green parties face barriers to gaining federal or provincial/regional/state seats. The Australian Labor Party's practice of allocating a portion of ALP ticket votes to Australian Greens has helped bring AG candidates into parliament. During the 2025 election, How-to-vote cards from Labor tended to prefer the Greens over the centre-right Liberal-National Coalition during the 2025 election in the House of Representatives in 116 out of 150 seats.

In the 2008 ACT election in Australia, the Greens won 15.6% of the vote, winning 4 out of 17 seats. Shane Rattenbury was elected the speaker of the assembly, the first time a Green party member had held such a position in any parliament or assembly in Australia. However, they retained only one seat at the 2012 election in the same territory.

The Green Confederation (Confédération Verte) in Vanuatu won 3 out of 52 seats in the 2012 Vanuatuan general election in October 2012. Its most prominent member is Moana Carcasses Kalosil, who became prime minister in March 2013. Carcasses, a Green liberal, does not lead a Green government, but a broad coalition government in which he is the only Green minister.

There is a Papua New Guinea Greens Party, but it does not have any members in Parliament. There was briefly a Green Party in Fiji from 2008 to 2013; as Parliament was suspended by the military regime during this time, the party was not able to take part in any election before all parties were deregistered in 2013.

==== Lebanon ====
The Green Party of Lebanon was founded in 2008 as a secular party. Its first president was Philippe Skaff, CEO of Grey Advertising. The party debuted with the May 2010 municipal elections. In 2011, the party became the first political party in Lebanon to elect a female leader when Nada Zaarour was elected its president.

==== Israel ====
Many attempts to establish a green party were made. For example, the Greens were established in 1997. In the 1999 Knesset elections the party received 0.4% of the vote, failing to win a seat. They received the same share of the vote in the 2003 elections.

==== Pakistan ====
The Pakistan Green Party was founded in 2002.

==== Taiwan ====
The Green Party Taiwan was founded in 1996. It is a small party which have often associated with Democratic Progressive Party, a major political party in Taiwan.

=== Europe ===
==== Belgian and German roots ====
The first green parties in Europe were founded in the late 1970s, following the rise of environmental awareness and the development of new social movements. Green parties in Belgium first made a breakthrough. Belgium had Green members of parliament elected first in the 1970s, and with seats on the local council, held the balance of power in the city of Liege, so were the first to go into coalition with the ruling party on that council. In 1979 political campaigns and dissident groups feeling underrepresented in west German politics formed a coalition to contest the 1979 elections to the European Parliament.

Although they did not win any seats, the groups in this association formally agreed to become a party and won a breakthrough in the German national elections of 1983. They were not the first Green Party in Europe to have members elected nationally but the impression was created that they had been, because they attracted the most media attention. This was partly due to their charismatic leader Petra Kelly, a German who was of interest to the American media because she had an American step-father. Since its foundation in 1980 and merger with Alliance 90 after the German reunification, Kelly's party, now named Alliance '90/The Greens, has become one of Europe's most important Green parties. It played an important role in the formation of national-level Green parties in other countries such as Spain as well. The forerunner of the Green Party in the United Kingdom was the PEOPLE Party, formed in Coventry in 1972. It changed its name to the Ecology Party in 1973 and the Green Party in 1985.

==== 1984–1989: A new political force ====
In 1984 Greens agreed a common platform for the European Parliament Elections and the first Green Members of the European Parliament were elected then. Germany, a stronghold of the Green movement, elected seven MEPs; two more came from Belgium and two from the Netherlands. As those eleven MEPs did not entitle the Greens to form a parliamentary group on their own, they concluded an alliance with MEPs from Italy, Denmark, and regionalists from Flanders and Ireland to form the GRAEL (Green Alternative European Link) group, also known as the Rainbow Group. Politically they engaged in the fight against environmental pollution, nuclear energy (1986 saw the Chernobyl disaster), the promotion of animal protection and the campaign against the demolition of Brussels by speculation fuelled by the presence of the European institutions.

==== Since the 1990s ====
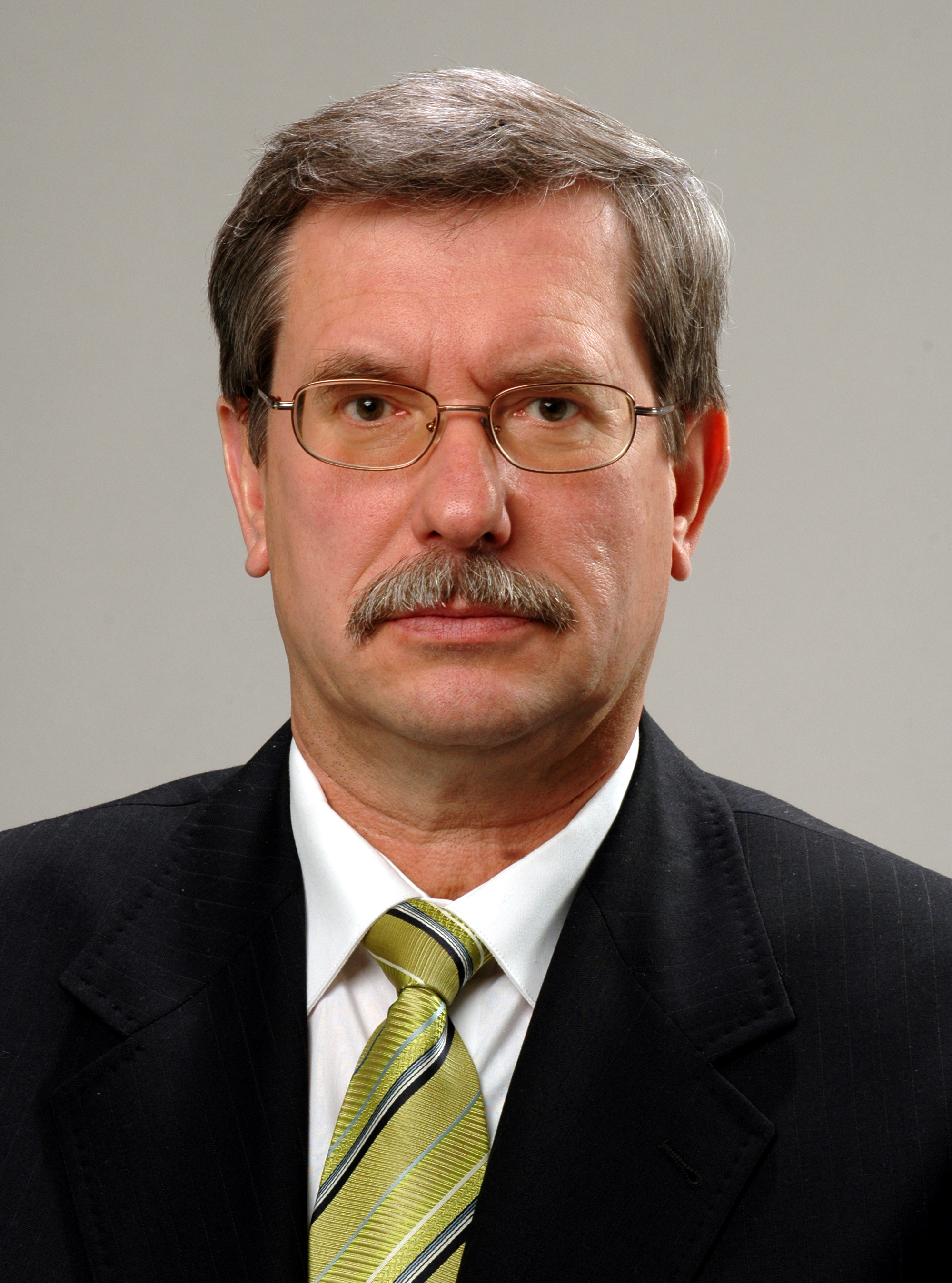
Indulis Emsis of the Latvian Green Party became Prime Minister of Latvia in 2004, and the world's first green head of government.

After years of co-operation between the national Green parties, they formed a pan-European alliance that unites most European Green parties. The Greens are a party within the European parliament with 46 seats, as of June 2009. It has a long-standing alliance with the European Free Alliance (EFA), an alliance of "stateless nations", such as the Welsh nationalist Plaid Cymru and Scottish National Party. Together European Green Party/EFA have 58 seats and they are the fourth largest party in the European Parliament.

While on many issues European Greens practice the same policies, one issue divides European Green parties: the European Union. Some Green parties, like the Dutch GreenLeft, the Green Party of England and Wales, the Swiss Green Party, the Irish Green Party and the German Alliance '90/The Greens, are pro-European while some, like the Green party in Sweden, are moderately eurosceptic.

Some Green parties have been part of governing coalitions. The first one was the Finnish Green League that entered government in 1995. The Italian Federation of the Greens, the French Greens, the German Alliance '90/The Greens and both Belgian Green parties, the French-speaking Ecolo and the Dutch-speaking Agalev were part of government during the late 1990s. Most successful was the Latvian Green Party, who supplied the Prime Minister of Latvia in 2004. The Swedish Green Party was a long-term supporter of the social-democratic minority government until the election 2006 when the social-democratic party lost. The Irish Green Party is currently in government, having entered a coalition with Fianna Fáil and Fine Gael in June 2020, with three cabinet positions. It was previously in a coalition government with Fianna Fáil from 2007 until January 2011 when the party withdrew their support for the ruling coalition.

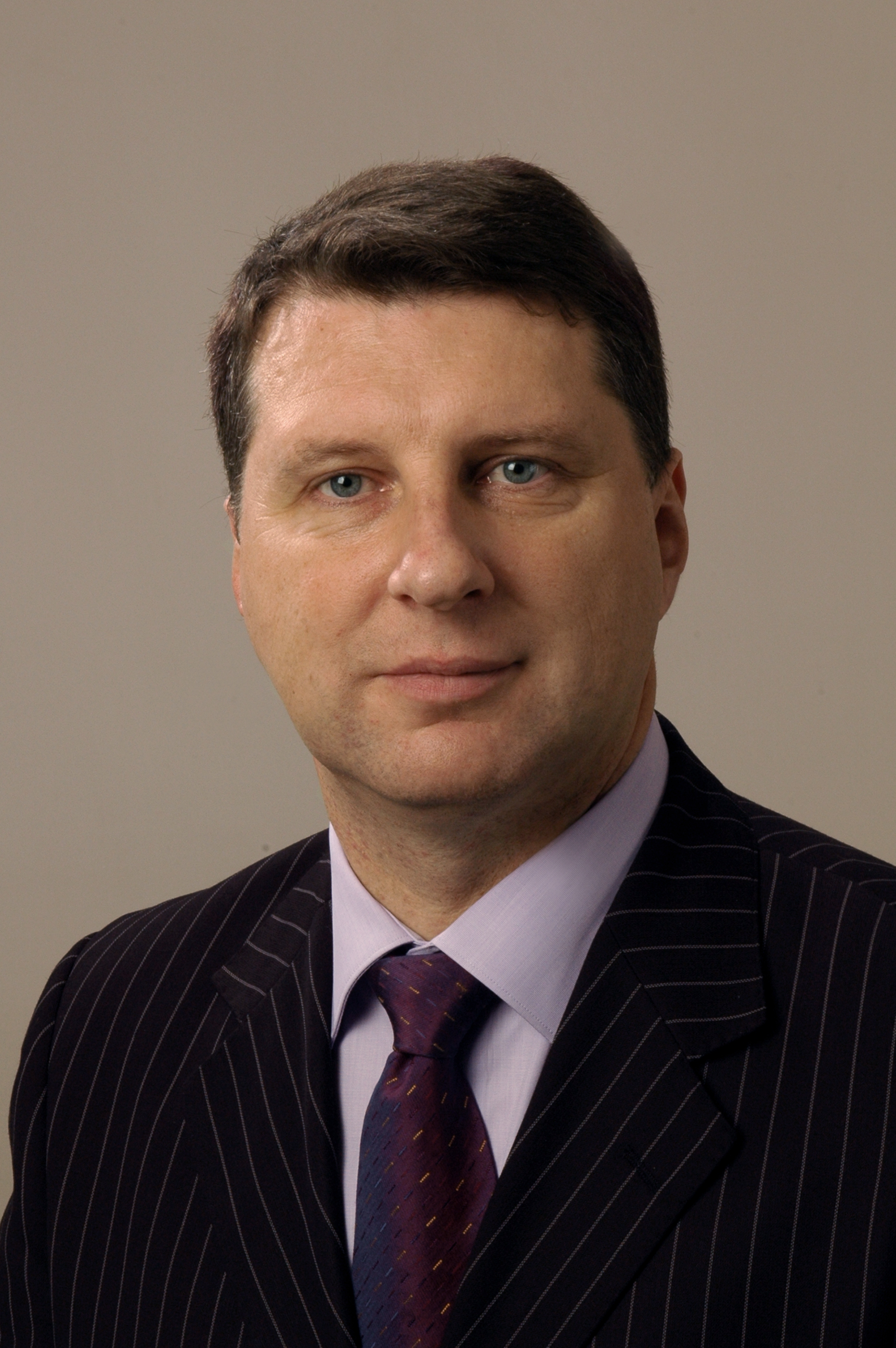
Raimonds Vējonis, President of Latvia

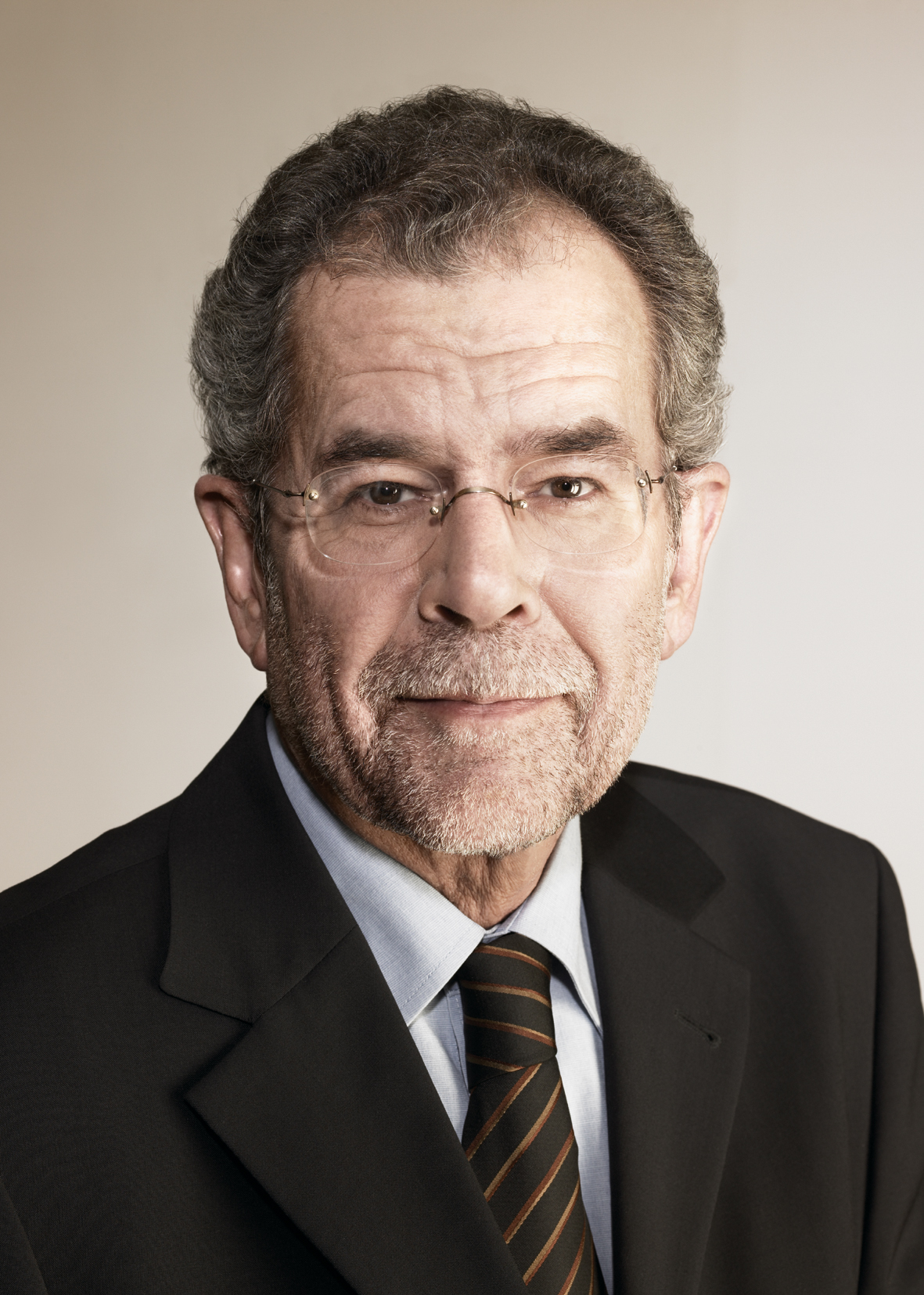
Alexander Van der Bellen, President of Austria

Vējonis (elected 2015) and Van der Bellen (elected 2016) are Europe's first two green heads of state.

In Scandinavia, left-wing socialist parties have formed the Nordic Green Left Alliance. These parties have the same ideals as European Greens. However, they do not cooperate with the Global Greens or European Greens, but instead form a combined parliamentary group with the Party of the European Left, which unites communists and post-communists. There is one exception, in 2004 the MEP for Danish Socialist People's Party has left the Nordic Green Left parliamentary group and has joined the Green parliamentary group in the European parliament. The Socialist People's Party is currently an observer at the European Green Party and the Global Greens. Outside of Scandinavia, in 2004, Latvia became the first country in the world to have a Green politician become Head of Government, but in 2006 the Green Party received only 16.71 percent of the vote. In the Estonia 2007 parliamentary elections, the Estonian Greens won 7.1 percent of the vote, and a mandate for six seats in the country's parliament, the Riigikogu. Other significant electoral results for European green parties include Germany's Alliance '90/The Greens in the 2002 federal election and France's Europe Ecology – The Greens in the 2012 legislative election, in which they both won more seats than any other third party.

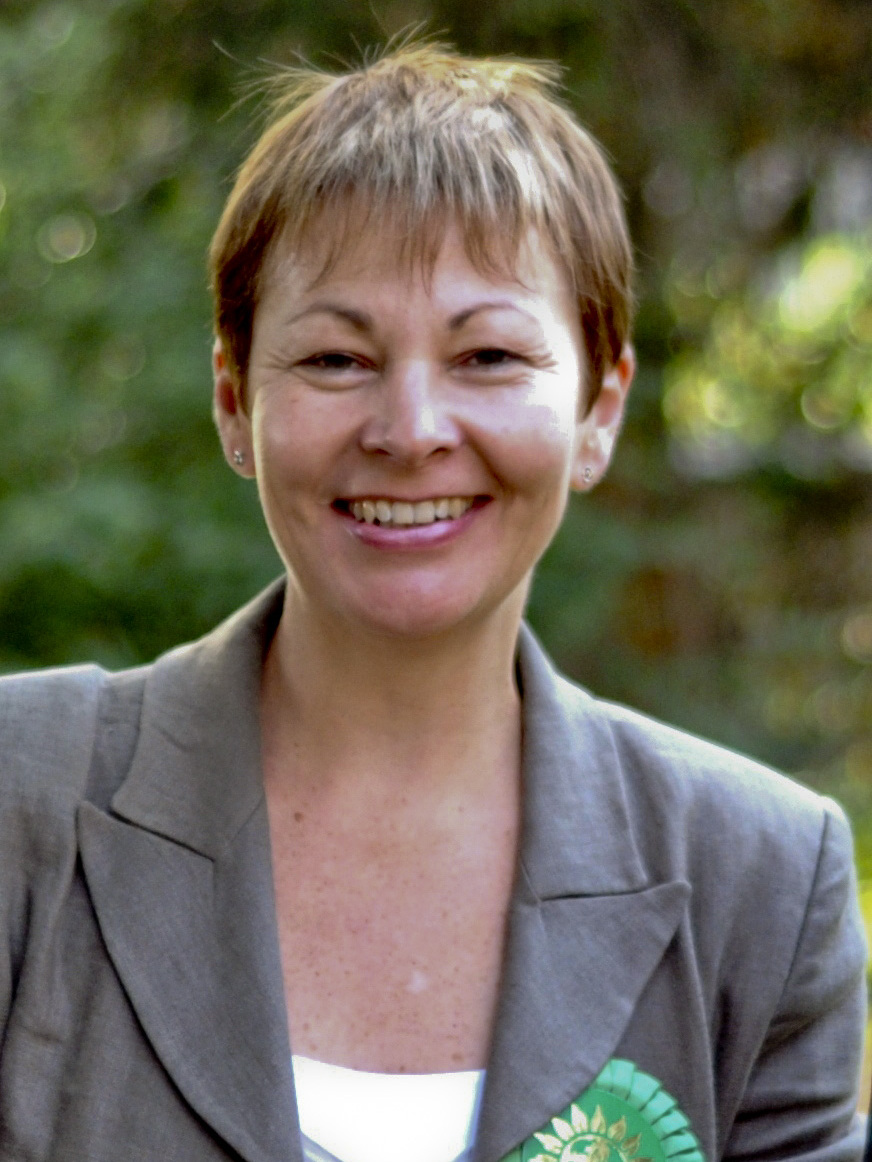
British MP Caroline Lucas was the UK's first green politician elected under the first-past-the-post system.

In some countries Greens have found it difficult to win any representation in the national parliament. Three reasons can be found for this. It includes countries with a first past the post electoral system, such as the United Kingdom. However, despite the first past the post system in the United Kingdom, the Green Party of England and Wales won their first seat in the House of Commons when Caroline Lucas won the seat of Brighton Pavilion in 2010. In July 2024, after a targeted campaign, 4 Green MPs were elected in Bristol Central, Waveney Valley, North Herefordshire and Brighton Pavilion. In February 2026, Hannah Spencer was elected in Gorton & Denton, becoming the Green Party's fifth MP. The Scottish Greens have had success in the devolved Scottish Parliament previously signing a (now ended) deal to enter a governing coalition, whilst the Green Party Northern Ireland has had success in the devolved Northern Ireland Assembly and local elections where the first-past-the-post system is not used. In countries where a party with similar ideals is stronger, such as Norway and Denmark, Green parties tend to perform worse. In some Eastern European countries, like Romania, Green parties are still in the process of formation and have therefore not gained enough support. In Poland the Green Party, registered in 2004, won their first three seats in the Sejm in 2019. The Green Party of Bulgaria was founded in Sofia in 1989 by Aleksandar Karakachanov. Green Movement (ZD) was a member of an anti-corruption coalition - Democratic Bulgaria (DB). Ecoglasnost is a member of the BSP for Bulgaria coalition. For the elections in 2022, the Party of the Greens (Партия на зелените, ПнЗ, PnZ) joined the Bulgarian Rise coalition.

The European Green Party has worked to support weak Green parties in European countries. Until recently, they were giving support to Green parties in the Mediterranean countries. These Green parties are now making electoral gains, e.g. in Spain, Greece and Republic of Cyprus, or getting organized to do so, e.g. in Malta. Therefore, the EGP is now turning its attention to Eastern Europe – all these countries have Green parties, but in materially poor Eastern Europe the success of Green Parties is patchy except for Hungary, where the local Green party, Politics Can Be Different (LMP), has been elected to parliament and many city councils.

In 2021 Croatian local elections We can! party became the largest political party in the Zagreb Assembly, winning 23 seats in total. Their mayoral candidate Tomislav Tomašević won a landslide victory on 31 May.

==== Germany ====
As mentioned above, the German green party holds strong influence in terms of green politics in Europe. The German green party: Alliance 90/The Greens (Bündnis 90/Die Grünen) was founded in 1993 after the West German green party (Die Grünen, formed in 1980) and the East German green party (Bündnis 90, formed in 1990) joined after the reunification of Germany.

in 1998, Alliance 90/The Greens joined a coalition government with the SPD, forming a Red-Green alliance that would last until 2005. In order to agree to the coalition, Alliance 90/The Greens had 3 priorities: to reduce unemployment, close nuclear-power stations/Germany to not rely on nuclear power, and for citizenship laws to be reformed. The coalition remained in place following the 2002 election. However, green policies were no longer considered to be a focal point so much, with unemployment growing and other economic issues being more pressing, leading to the rise of the CDU/CSU, and the eventual loss of a majority in parliament.

==== Turkey ====
Greens and the Left Party of the Future is a left-libertarian and green party in Turkey. It was founded on 25 November 2012 as a merger of the Greens Party and the Equality and Democracy Party.

Prominent members include Murat Belge, left-liberal political author and columnist for Taraf; Kutluğ Ataman, filmmaker and contemporary artist; and Ufuk Uras, former Istanbul deputy and president of the Freedom and Solidarity Party.

The party is one of the participants in the Peoples' Democratic Congress, a political initiative instrumental in founding the Peoples' Democratic Party in 2012.

The Greens, along with feminists, left YSGP en masse in 2016, citing its lack of democratic decision making practices. They and a new generation of activists reestablished the Green Party (Yeşiller) in 2020.

=== North America ===
As of the 41st general election in Canada, held on May 2, 2011, there was only one federally elected member of the Green Party of Canada in the House of Commons of Canada, its leader Elizabeth May. However, at the dissolution of the 41st Parliament on August 2, 2015, the Green Party of Canada held two seats in the House of Commons, the second seat belonging to formerly Independent MP Bruce Hyer who was elected to the House of Commons as a member of the NDP in 2011. Only May won re-election to the 42nd parliament. Mike Morrice was elected to the 43rd parliament, returning Greens to two seats. There remains no federal representation by the Green Party of the United States in the U.S. Congress. Accordingly, in these countries, Green parties focus on electoral reform. In Mexico, however, the Partido Verde Ecologista, often abbreviated as PVEM, has 17 deputies and four senators in Congress as a result of the 2006 elections. Nevertheless, some of its political practices such as plead in favor of the death penalty in Mexico, led to the European Green Party's withdrawal of recognition of the PVEM as a legitimate green party.

==== Canada ====
The first Green parties in Canada (both federal and provincial) were founded in 1983. The strongest provincial Green parties are the Green Party of British Columbia, the Green Party of Ontario, the Green Party of New Brunswick, and the Green Party of Prince Edward Island which was elected the Official Opposition in the 2019 election. The first ever BC Green MLA was elected in 2013, and in 2017 they helped the minority NDP form government. In 2014 a Green MLA was elected to the New Brunswick legislature, in 2015 a Green MLA was elected to the Prince Edward Island Legislature, and in 2018 Mike Schreiner became the first Green MPP elected to the Ontario provincial legislature. Federally, the Green Party of Canada received 6.49% of the popular vote and a record three seats in Parliament during the 2019 federal election, breaking ground in Atlantic Canada with the election of Jenica Atwin as the first federal Green from outside of British Columbia. This is up from one seat (later two) and 3.91% won in the 2015 federal election. Although Elizabeth May (the leader of the GPC from 2006 to 2019) was the first elected Member of Parliament, the first seat was gained in the House of Commons on August 30, 2008, when sitting Independent MP Blair Wilson joined the party. As of September 2020, May continues to sit as a Member of Parliament for Saanich-Gulf Islands and has exerted a considerable amount of legislative influence on a number of issues ranging from denying unanimous consent for military intervention in Libya, playing a central role in exposing changes to environmental legislation hidden in the omnibus Budget Bill C-38, to introducing a private member's bill to develop a national strategy on Lyme disease. Mike Morrice joined May in Parliament in 2021 representing Kitchener Centre and has been active on disability issues.

In the 2008 Vancouver municipal election, Stuart Mackinnon, a member of the Vancouver Green Party, was elected to the Vancouver Parks Board. Since that time former Green Party of British Columbia leader, and deputy-leader of the federal Green party, Adriane Carr won the Greens' first seat on Vancouver City Council, in 2011 municipal elections.

==== United States ====
In the United States, Greens first ran for public office in 1985. Since then, the Green Party of the United States has claimed electoral victories at the municipal, county and state levels. The first U.S. Greens to be elected were David Conley and Frank Koehn in Wisconsin 1986. Each was elected to a position on the County Board of Supervisors in Douglas and Bayfield counties respectively. Keiko Bonk was first elected in 1992 in Hawaii County, becoming Official Chairwoman in 1995. The first Green Party mayor was Kelly Weaverling, elected in Cordova, AK in 1991.

As of April 2018, 156 Greens held elective office across the US in 19 states. The states with the largest numbers of Green elected officials are California (68), Connecticut (15), and Pennsylvania (15). Titles of offices held include: Alderman, Auditor, Board of Appeals, Board of Finance, Board of Selectmen, Borough Council, Budget Committee, Circuit Court Judge, City Council, Common Council, Community College District Board of Trustees, Community Service Board, Conservation Congress, Constable, County Board of Supervisors, County Supervisor, Fire Commission, Fire District Board, Inspector of Elections, Judge of Elections, Mayor, Neighborhood Council Board, Park District, Parks and Recreation District Board, Library Board, Planning Board, Public Housing Authority Resident Advisory Board, Public Service District, Rent Stabilization Board, Sanitary District Board, School Board, Soil and Water Conservation Board, State Representative, Town Council, Transit District Board, Village Trustee, Water District Board, and Zoning Board of Appeals. The first US Green elected to a state legislature was Audie Bock in 1999, to the California State Assembly, followed by John Eder to the Maine House of Representatives in 2002 and 2004 and Richard Carroll to the Arkansas House of Representatives in 2008. While in office in 2003 in the New Jersey General Assembly, incumbent Matt Ahearn made a party switch to Green for the remainder of his term.

The Green Party has contested seven presidential elections: in 1996 and 2000 with Ralph Nader for president and Winona LaDuke as vice president, in 2004 with David Cobb for president and Pat LaMarche for vice president, and in 2008 with Cynthia McKinney for president and Rosa Clemente for vice president. In 2000, Nader received more votes for president than any Green Party candidate before or since. Jill Stein ran for president on the Green ticket in 2012, 2016 and 2024; the vice-presidential candidates were Cheri Honkala in 2012, Ajamu Baraka in 2016 and Butch Ware in 2024. Stein, who received over one million votes in the 2016 race, led unsuccessful attempts toward 2016 election recounts in three states: Michigan, Pennsylvania, and Wisconsin. In 2020, Howie Hawkins, a founder of the Green Party, was the party's presidential nominee.

=== South America ===
==== Brazil ====
The Brazilian Green Party was constituted after the military dictatorship period and, like other Green Parties around the world, is committed to establishing a set of policies on ensuring social-equity and sustainable development. One of the party's founding members was the journalist and former anti-dictatorship revolutionary Fernando Gabeira, Alfredo Sirkis and Carlos Minc. Among the main items on the Green Party's agenda are federalism, environmentalism, human rights, a form of direct democracy, parliamentarism, welfare, civil liberties, pacifism and marijuana legalization under specific conditions.

Green Party's candidate Marina Silva won 19.33% of the vote in the first round of the 2010 Brazilian presidential election (more than any other third party), taking enough votes from Dilma Rousseff of the incumbent PT to prevent her from achieving the majority of the vote needed to avoid a second round. Success in the legislature amounted to winning 2 more seats for a total of 15 in the Chamber of Deputies and the loss of their only senate seat.

Marina Silva left the party the following year.

In the 2014 presidential election the Green Party's candidate Eduardo Jorge received 0,61% of the vote. He garnered attention for campaigning on a progressive platform supporting policies such as cannabis legalization and the decriminalization of abortion. Because of his perceived eccentricity and spontaneity while participating in the televised debates, Jorge became the subject of several memes on the internet. The party elected 6 federal deputies and 1 senator.

In 2016, the Greens in Congress voted in favour of the impeachment of Dilma Rousseff. The party later went on to support president Michel Temer who succeeded her.

For the 2018 presidential election the party formed the coalition United to transform Brazil with the Sustainability Network (REDE), in support of the candidacy of Marina Silva in her third run for the presidency. Eduardo Jorge was chosen as her running mate. Despite faring well in the initial polls, Silva ultimately received 1% of the vote. The party elected 4 federal deputies.

==== Colombia ====
In the 1990s, the Oxygen Green Party was created under the leadership of Ingrid Betancourt but dissolved after her infamous kidnapping. Later, the Visionaries Party was created by Antanas Mockus whose ideals earned him the Bogotá Mayoral Office twice. In the 2010 Colombian presidential election a green party has been created under the name Colombian Green Party, with former Bogotá mayor Antanas Mockus being the leader.

== Green parties in government ==
While most green parties remain minor parties, some have entered into national coalition governments. The following table lists green parties that have entered into government at the national level. It does not include the green conservative parties of Latvia and Lithuania. It also excludes parties that were elected into government as a minor partner in an electoral alliance, such as the Italian Federation of the Greens which governed as a small part of the Olive Tree and Union alliances.

Country	Party	Years in government	Coalition partner/s
Finland	Green League	1995–2002	Social Democratic Party of Finland; National Coalition Party; Swedish People's Party of Finland; Left Alliance
Finland	Green League	2007–2011	Centre Party; National Coalition Party; Swedish People's Party of Finland
Finland	Green League	2011–2014	National Coalition Party; Social Democratic Party of Finland; Left Alliance; Swedish People's Party of Finland; Christian Democrats
Finland	Green League	2019–2023	Social Democratic Party of Finland; Centre Party; Left Alliance; Swedish People's Party of Finland
France	The Greens	1997–2002	Socialist Party; French Communist Party; Radical Party of the Left; Citizen and Republican Movement
France	Europe Ecology – The Greens	2012–2014	Socialist Party; Radical Party of the Left; Walwari
France	Ecologist Party	2016–2017	Socialist Party; Radical Party of the Left
Germany	Alliance 90/The Greens	1998–2005	Social Democratic Party of Germany
Germany	Alliance 90/The Greens	2021–2024	Social Democratic Party of Germany; Free Democratic Party
Germany	Alliance 90/The Greens	2024–2025	Social Democratic Party of Germany
Belgium	Ecolo	1999–2003	Open Flemish Liberals and Democrats; Liberal Reformist Party; Socialist Party; Flemish Socialist Party
Belgium	Agalev	1999–2003	Open Flemish Liberals and Democrats; Liberal Reformist Party; Socialist Party; Flemish Socialist Party
Belgium	Ecolo	2020–2025	Open Flemish Liberals and Democrats; Reformist Movement; Vooruit; Socialist Party; Christian Democratic and Flemish
Belgium	Groen	2020–2025	Open Flemish Liberals and Democrats; Reformist Movement; Vooruit; Socialist Party; Christian Democratic and Flemish
Ireland	Green Party	2007–2011	Fianna Fáil; Progressive Democrats
Ireland	Green Party	2020–2025	Fianna Fáil; Fine Gael
Czech Republic	Green Party	2007–2009	Civic Democratic Party; KDU-ČSL
Iceland	Left-Green Movement	2009–2013	Social Democratic Alliance
Iceland	Left-Green Movement	2017–2024	Independence Party; Progressive Party
Denmark	Green Left	2011–2014	Social Democrats; Danish Social Liberal Party
Denmark	Green Left	2026–present	Social Democrats; Moderates; Danish Social Liberal Party
Luxembourg	The Greens	2013–2023	Democratic Party; Luxembourg Socialist Workers' Party
Sweden	Green Party (Sweden)	2014–2021	Swedish Social Democratic Party
New Zealand	Green Party of Aotearoa New Zealand	2017–2020	New Zealand Labour Party; New Zealand First
New Zealand	Green Party of Aotearoa New Zealand	2020–2023	New Zealand Labour Party
Austria	The Greens – The Green Alternative	2020–2025	Austrian People's Party
Montenegro	United Reform Action	2020–2022	Ne damo Crnu Goru
Montenegro	United Reform Action	2022–2023	Socialist People's Party of Montenegro; Social Democratic Party of Montenegro; Bosniak Party

== See also ==
- Green and chartreuse – colors associated with the Green movement
- List of green political parties
- Outline of green politics
