= Green (disambiguation) =

Green is a color.

Green may also refer to:

== Law and politics ==
- Environmentally friendly, or green
- Green, a member of a Green party, a political party based on green politics
  - Green Party (disambiguation), list of Green parties

== Media, arts and entertainment ==
=== Fictional characters ===
- Green (Gunstar Heroes), a character in the video game Gunstar Heroes
- Green (Pokémon Adventures), in Pokémon Adventures
- Green, a character in Rainbow Friends
- Blue (Pokémon), a character in the video games Pokémon Red, Blue, and Yellow whose Japanese name is "Green"
- Green, a character from the video game Deltarune

=== Music ===
- Green (band), a Chicago band

==== Albums ====
- Green (Green album), 1986
- Green (B'z album), 2002
- Green (Forbidden album), 1997
- Green (Steve Hillage album), 1978
- Green (Remon Stotijn album), 2006
- Green (R.E.M. album), 1988
- Green (Hank Roberts album), 2008
- Green (John Paul Young album), 1977
- Green (Hiroshi Yoshimura album), 1986
- Green, an album by Universal Indicator, 1996
- Greengreen, an album by Cortis, 2026

==== Songs ====
- "Green" (Brendan James song), 2008
- "Green" (Goodshirt song), 2000
- "Green" (Alex Lloyd song), 2002
- "Green", a song by Frank Sinatra from the album Frank Sinatra Conducts Tone Poems of Color
- "Green", a song by Throwing Muses from the album Throwing Muses
- "Green", a piece by Miles Davis from the 1989 album Aura
- "Green", a song by Ayumi Hamasaki from the 2008 single "Days/Green"
- "Green", a song by Orchestral Manoeuvres in the Dark from the album History of Modern
- Green, a song by Raven-Symoné from self titled album
- "Green", a song by The Dandy Warhols from the album The Dandy Warhols Come Down
- "Green", a song by The Bats from the album Silverbeet
- "Green", a song by Status Quo from the album Heavy Traffic
- "Green", a song by Zzbra from the album Zzbra: Original Motion Picture Soundtrack, 2012
- Several settings for voice and piano of the poem "Green" by French poet Paul Verlaine, including:
  - Claude Debussy, one of the Ariettes oubliées, a song cycle composed in 1885-87
  - Gabriel Fauré, one of the Cinq mélodies "de Venise", a song cycle composed in 1891
  - Reynaldo Hahn, under the title "Offrande" (1891), published in the collection 20 Mélodies, 1^{er} recueil

=== Literature ===
- Green (novel), a novel by Ted Dekker
- Green (picture book), a children's picture book written and illustrated by Laura Vaccaro Seeger
- "Green", a French-language poem by Paul Verlaine

=== Television ===
- "Green" (The Bear), a 2025 episode of The Bear TV series
- "Green", a Series G episode of the television series QI (2010)
- "Green", an episode of the show Teletubbies

== Organizations and businesses ==
- Green Engine Co, a British engine manufacturer in the early part of the 20th century
- H. L. Green Company, formerly a chain of stores
- Green Airlines, a German airline

== People ==
- Green (surname), a list of people and fictional characters with the surname
- Green Adams (1812-1884), American politician
- Green Gartside (born 1955), British musician and frontman of the band Scritti Politti born Paul Julian Strohmeyer
- Green Nwankwo (born 1933), Nigerian scholar, author and traditional ruler
- Green Pinckney Russell (1861/63–1939), American educator, college president

== Places ==
=== Extraterrestrial ===
- Green (lunar crater)
- Green (Martian crater)
- Green Valley (Mars)

=== Terrestrial ===
- Green, Kansas, United States, a city
- Green, Kentucky, United States, an unincorporated community
- Green, Ohio, United States, a city
- Green, Oregon, United States, a census-designated place
- Green County, Kentucky, United States
- Green County, Wisconsin, United States
- Green Creek (disambiguation)
- Green Glacier (Haskell Ridge), Oates Land, Antarctica
- Green Glacier, Graham Land, Antarctica
- Green Island (disambiguation)
- Green Lake (disambiguation)
- Green Mountain (disambiguation)
- Green Mountains, Vermont, United States
- Green Park, a park in the City of Westminster, central London, England
- Green River (disambiguation)
- Green Township (disambiguation)
- Green Valley (Antarctica), Ellsworth Land

== Schools ==
- Green College, Oxford, England
- Green College, University of British Columbia, Canada
- Green High School (disambiguation)

== Other uses ==
- GREEN (certification), a real estate professional certification
- Green Magazine, for John Deere tractor enthusiasts
- Green, a term used in professional wrestling
- GREEN, a code name for a Japanese clone of the Enigma machine
- Green, the code name for the programming-language design that was chosen for the Ada programming language
- Green or greenback, the United States dollar, specifically the Federal Reserve Notes, referring to their green color
- Green track, a type of railway track in which the track bed and surrounding area are planted with grass turf or other vegetation as ground cover
- Putting green, a finely-cut grassed area surrounding the hole on a golf course
- Village green, or town green, public land in the middle of or adjacent to a settlement which was historically common pasture
- Green (RTA Rapid Transit station), Cleveland, Ohio, United States
- Greens, a Byzantine chariot racing faction

== See also ==
- Greeeen, a Japanese band
- Greene (disambiguation)
- Greens (disambiguation)
- Grin (disambiguation)
- Grün, a surname
- The Green (disambiguation)
- The Greens (disambiguation)
