= Grün (disambiguation) =

Grün is a German-language surname.

Grün or Gruen may also refer to:

== Politics ==
- Die Grünen, the name of several green parties:
  - Alliance 90/The Greens (Bündnis 90/Die Grünen), a German party
  - The Greens – The Green Alternative (Die Grünen – Die Grüne Alternative), an Austrian party
  - Green Party of Switzerland (Grüne Partei der Schweiz)

== Business ==
- Grüns, American multivitamin gummies
- Gruen Watch Co., an American watch company

== Recreation ==
- Gruene Hall, the oldest dance hall in Texas
- Grune, a character in the role-playing game Tales of Legendia

== Other ==
- Fall Grün (Czechoslovakia), a pre-World War II German plan for an aggressive war against Czechoslovakia
- Gruen transfer, in shopping mall design, the moment when consumers respond to "scripted disorientation" cues in the environment
- Gruen (TV series), Australian TV program about advertising
