= Gruene =

Gruene may refer to:

- Gruene, Texas
- Variation of Grün, surname
- Die Grünen, German for "The Greens"
