= Green River station =

Green River station may refer to:

- Green River station (Utah), an Amtrak train station in Emery County, Utah
- Green River station (Wyoming), a former Amtrak train station in Sweetwater County, Wyoming
- Green River Generating Station, a former power plant in Muhlenberg County, Kentucky

== See also ==
- Green River (disambiguation)
