= Les Verts =

Les Verts (English: The Greens) is the (nick)name of various green political parties in French-speaking countries such as:

official name:

- Europe Ecology – The Greens, France
- The Greens (Benin)
- The Greens (France)
- The Greens (Luxembourg)
- The Greens (Mauritius)

nickname:

- Green Party of Canada in Quebec
- Green Party of Switzerland
- Ecolo in Belgium (active in Wallonia and Brussels)

See also:

- Parti écologiste "Les Verts" v European Parliament, a case before the European Court of Justice
