= Grin =

Grin, grins, or GRIN may refer to:

- A facial expression, see smile
- Grin (Coroner album), 1993
- Grin (band), a band formed by Nils Lofgren
  - Grin (Grin album), 1971
- "Grins" (song), a 2013 song by Charli XCX off the album True Romance (Charli XCX album)
- Grin (surname)
- Grins, Austria
- Germplasm Resources Information Network, a software project
- Grin (company), a defunct Swedish video game developer
- GRIN Campaign, an organisation which campaigns for equality in education
- GRIN, an acronym for gradient index; see Gradient-index optics

== See also ==
- Grün, a German word and surname meaning green
