= Green Creek =

Green Creek, Greens Creek or Green's Creek may refer to:

== In Antarctica ==
- Green Creek (Antarctica), in the Taylor Valley

== In Canada ==
- Green Creek, Nova Scotia, a small community
- Green's Creek (Ontario), a tributary of the Ottawa River

== In the United States ==
- Greens Creek mine, Alaska
- Greens Creek (Meramec River), stream in Missouri, a tributary of the Meramec River
- Green Creek, New Jersey, an unincorporated community
- Green Creek Township, Sandusky County, Ohio
- Green Creek (Ohio), a tributary of the Sandusky River
- Green Creek, Ohio, an unincorporated community
- Green Creek (Fishing Creek), a stream in Pennsylvania

== See also ==
- Green Valley Creek, a stream in Sonoma County, California
- Green River (disambiguation)
