= Green Mountain (disambiguation) =

Green Mountain or Green Mountains may refer to:

== Mountains ==
- Green Mountain, the main peak on Ascension Island
- Green Mountain (Libya) (Jebel Akhdar), a forested upland area in Cyrenaica in eastern Libya
- Green Mountain (Oman), (Jebel Akhdar), part of the Al Hajar mountain range in Oman
- Green Mountain (Boulder, Colorado), a mountain in Boulder, Colorado
- Green Mountain (Lakewood, Colorado), a mountain in the western suburbs of Denver
- Green Mountain (Kenosha Mountains), a mountain in the Pike National Forest of Jefferson County, Colorado
- Green Mountain (King County, Washington), a mountain near Mount Si
- Green Mountain (Kitsap County, Washington), a mountain on the Kitsap Peninsula in Western Washington
- Green Mountain (Snohomish County, Washington), a mountain in the Cascade Mountains of Washington
- A nickname of Mount Carmel (ההר הירוק)
- Green Mountains, the range of mountains in the middle of Vermont

== Populated places ==
- Green Mountain, New Brunswick, a rural community in York County, New Brunswick, Canada
- Green Mountain Falls, Colorado, U.S.
- Green Mountain, Iowa, U.S.
- Green Mountain, North Carolina, U.S.
- Zielona Góra, Poland

== Other uses ==
- Green Mountain College, a former private liberal arts college in Poultney, Vermont
- Green Mountain High School, in Lakewood, Colorado
- Green Mountain Lake, a lake in Minnesota
- Green Mountain line, a light rail line in Taiwan
- Green Mountain Railroad, a railroad operating in Vermont
- Green Mountain Reservoir, in Colorado along the Blue River

== See also ==
- Green Mountain Coffee Roasters, American former coffee company
- Mountain Green, Utah
- Monteverde (disambiguation)
