= Monteverde (disambiguation) =

Monteverde is a small town in the Province of Puntarenas known for the Monteverde Cloud Forest Reserve.

Monteverde may refer to:

== People ==
- Juan Domingo de Monteverde (1773–1832), Capitan General of Venezuela from 1812 to 1813
- Giulio Monteverde (1837–1917), Italian naturalist and sculptor
- Lily Monteverde (born 1928), Filipino film producer
- Lucas Monteverde (born 1976), Argentine polo player
- Patrick Monteverde (born 1997), American baseball player

== Places ==
=== Brazil ===
- Monte Verde, a district of Camanducaia

=== Chile ===
- Monte Verde, an archaeological site

=== Costa Rica ===
- Monteverde (canton), canton in Puntarenas province, Costa Rica
- Monteverde Cloud Forest Reserve
- Serpentario de Monteverde
- Monteverde Theme Park

=== Italy ===
- Monteverde, Campania, a comune in the Province of Avellino
- Monteverde, Lazio, a district in the City of Rome

=== Popular media ===
- Monteverde, an island in the 2020 film, Dolittle

== Other uses ==
- Monteverde (TV series), a 2025 Mexican telenovela produced by TelevisaUnivision

== See also ==
- Monteverdi (disambiguation)
- Green Mountain (disambiguation)
