= The Greens =

The Greens or Greens may refer to:

== Current political parties ==
- The Greens – The Green Alternative, Austria
- Australian Greens, also known as The Greens
- Greens of Andorra
- The Greens (Benin)
- The Greens (Bulgaria)
- Greens of Bosnia and Herzegovina
- Greens of Burkina
- The Greens (Denmark)
- Greens–European Free Alliance, in the European Parliament
- Green League (Finland), also known as The Greens
- Europe Ecology – The Greens, France
- Alliance 90/The Greens, Germany
- Greens (Greece)
- The Greens (Israel)
- Federation of the Greens, Italy
- The Greens (Luxembourg)
- The Greens (Mauritius)
- Greens of Montenegro
- The Greens (Netherlands)
- Russian Ecological Party "The Greens"
- Greens of Serbia
- Greens of Slovenia
- Greens (South Tyrol)
- Confederation of the Greens, Spain
- Green Party of Switzerland
- The Greens (Poland)
- Ecologist Party "The Greens", Portugal

== Historical political parties ==
- The Greens (France)
- The Greens, a political faction and associated chariot-racing team in the Byzantine empire; involved in the deadly Nika riots of 532

== Sports teams ==
- Maccabi Haifa F.C., nicknamed The Greens.

== See also ==
- Greens (disambiguation)
- Green politics
- Green Party (disambiguation)
- Green Party of Aotearoa New Zealand
- Green Party of England and Wales
- Green Party (Ireland)
- Green Party of the United States
- Les Verts (disambiguation)
- The Green (disambiguation)

== Other ==
- The Greens, a 1996 book by Bob Brown
