= Dip slope =

Schematic cross section of a cuesta, dip slopes facing left and harder rock layers in darker colors than softer ones

A dip slope is a topographic or geomorphic surface which slopes in the same direction, and often by the same angle, as the true dip or apparent dip of the underlying strata. A dip slope consists of the upper surface of a resistant layer of rock, often called caprock, that is commonly only slightly lowered and reduced in steepness by erosion. Dip slopes form the backslopes of cuestas, homoclinal ridges, hogbacks, and flatirons. The frontslopes of such ridges consist of either an escarpment, a steep slope, or perhaps even a line of cliffs. Generally, cuestas and homoclinal ridges are asymmetrical in that their dip slopes are less steep than their escarpments. In the case of hogbacks and flatirons, the dip of the rocks is so steep that their dip slope approaches the escarpment in their steepness.

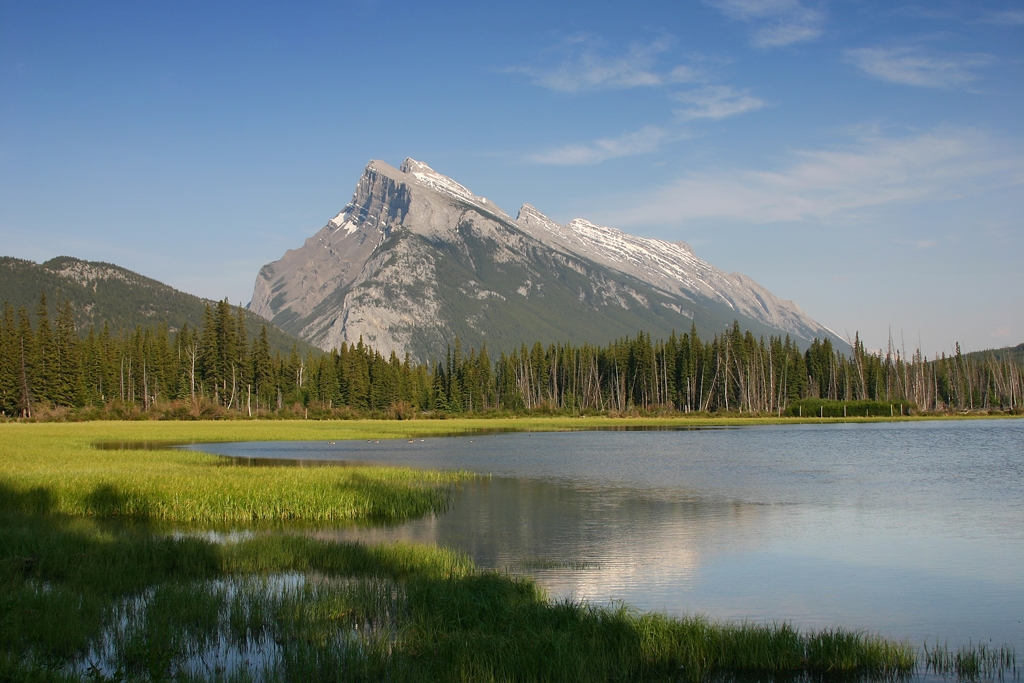
The south-facing (right) side of Mount Rundle in Canada is a good example of a dip slope. The ledge-forming dipping strata consists of Rundle Group dolomite.

Dip slopes are the result of the differential erosion of strata of varying resistance to erosion that are dipping uniformly in one direction. In this case, strata, i.e. shale, mudstone, and marl, that are less resistant to erosion are preferentially eroded relative to stronger strata, i.e. sandstone, limestone, and dolomite, that are more resistant to erosion. As a result, the less resistant strata will be eroded away leaving the more resistant strata as a caprock forming the dip slope (backslope) of a ridge that slopes in the direction of caprock. When this happens to flat-lying beds, landforms such as plateaus, mesas, and buttes are formed. The erosion of tilted beds will form landforms called cuestas, homoclinal ridges, hogbacks, and flatirons. Plateaus, mesas, and buttes have flat tops, while cuestas and homoclinal ridges are asymmetrical (~flat) areas w/ridges. The less steep side (at the low point) is their dip slope (intersecting 'ground' surface, and disappearing underground) and the steeper other side (the opposite, and at the high point) is their escarpment. In case of hogbacks, the steepness of the dip slope and escarpment will be about the same. Dip slopes can also be formed by igneous structures such as sills.

== Landslides ==
Some dip slopes are quite prone to landslides, due to the dipping strata that underlie them. Large sheets of rock have a tendency to slide down dip slopes.

== See also ==
- Strike and dip
