= Hogback (geology) =

Long, narrow ridge

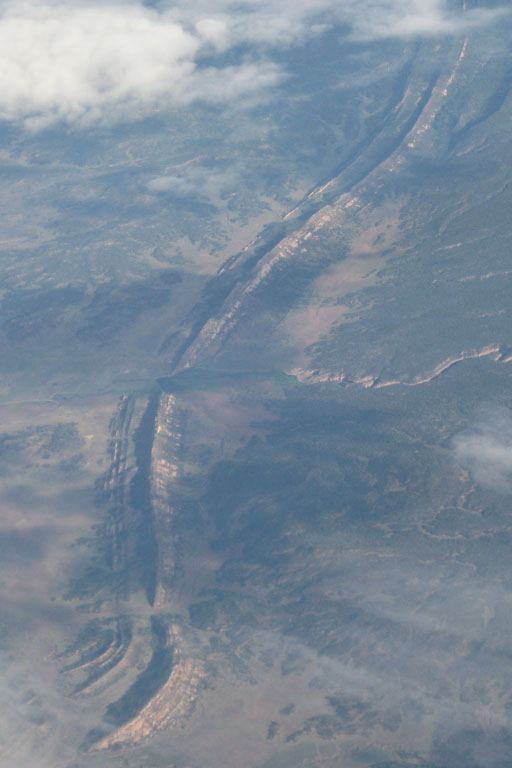
Oblique aerial photo of a hogback located between Gallup and Ramah in western New Mexico.

In geology and geomorphology, a hogback or hog's back is a long, narrow ridge or a series of hills with a narrow crest and steep slopes of nearly equal inclination on both flanks. Typically, the term is restricted to a ridge created by the differential erosion of outcropping, steeply dipping (greater than 30–40°), homoclinal, and typically sedimentary strata. One side of a hogback (its backslope) consists of the surface (bedding plane) of a steeply dipping rock stratum called a dip slope. The other side (its escarpment, frontslope or "scarp slope") is an erosion face that cuts through the dipping strata that comprises the hogback. The name "hogback" comes from the Hog's Back of the North Downs in Surrey, England, which refers to the landform's resemblance in outline to the back of a hog. The term is also sometimes applied to drumlins and, in Maine, to both eskers and ridges known as "horsebacks".

Hogbacks are a typical regional topographic expression of outcrops of steeply dipping strata, commonly sedimentary strata, that consist of alternating beds of hard, well-lithified strata, i.e. sandstone and limestone, and either weak or loosely cemented strata, i.e. shale, mudstone, and marl. The surface of a hard, erosion-resistant layer forms the back slope (dip-slope) of the hogback where weaker strata have been preferentially stripped off of it by erosion. The opposite slope that forms the front of a hogback, which is its escarpment or scarp, consists of a slope that cuts across the bedding of the strata. Because of the steeply dipping nature of the strata that form a hogback, a slight shift in location may take place as the landscape is lowered by erosion, but it will be a matter of feet rather than miles, as might happen with cuestas.

All gradations occur between hogbacks, homoclinal ridges, and cuestas. The differences between these landforms are related to the steepness in dip of the resistant beds from which they have been eroded and to their geographic extent. Where each type occurs depends upon whether the local rock attitudes are either nearly vertical, moderately dipping, or gently dipping. Because of their gradational nature, the exact angle of dip and slope that separates these landforms is arbitrary and some differences in the specific angles used to define these landforms can be found in the scientific literature. It also can be difficult to distinguish immediately adjacent members of this series of landforms.

== Examples ==
=== Europe ===
==== United Kingdom ====
- Hog's Back, of the North Downs in Surrey, England; the original hogback from which the landform derives its name. Formed from a monoclinal fold, leading to steeply dipping chalk beds which are more resistant to erosion than the flanking clays.

==== Belgium ====
- The Richelsley in the western North Eifel, Belgium.

==== Germany ====
- The Teufelsmauer ("Devil's Wall") in the northern Harz Foreland.
- The Externsteine in the Teutoburg Forest.
- The Ith, a knife-edge ridge in the Weser Uplands.

=== North America ===
==== Colorado ====
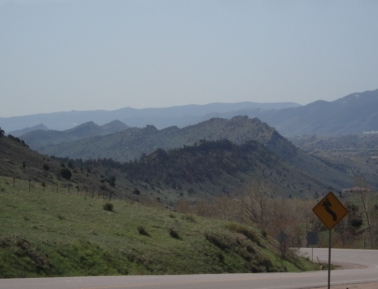
Dinosaur Ridge, west of Denver, Colorado. It is formed by the more erosion-resistant sandstones of the Dakota Formation protecting the softer, less erosion-resistant strata of the Morrison Formation.

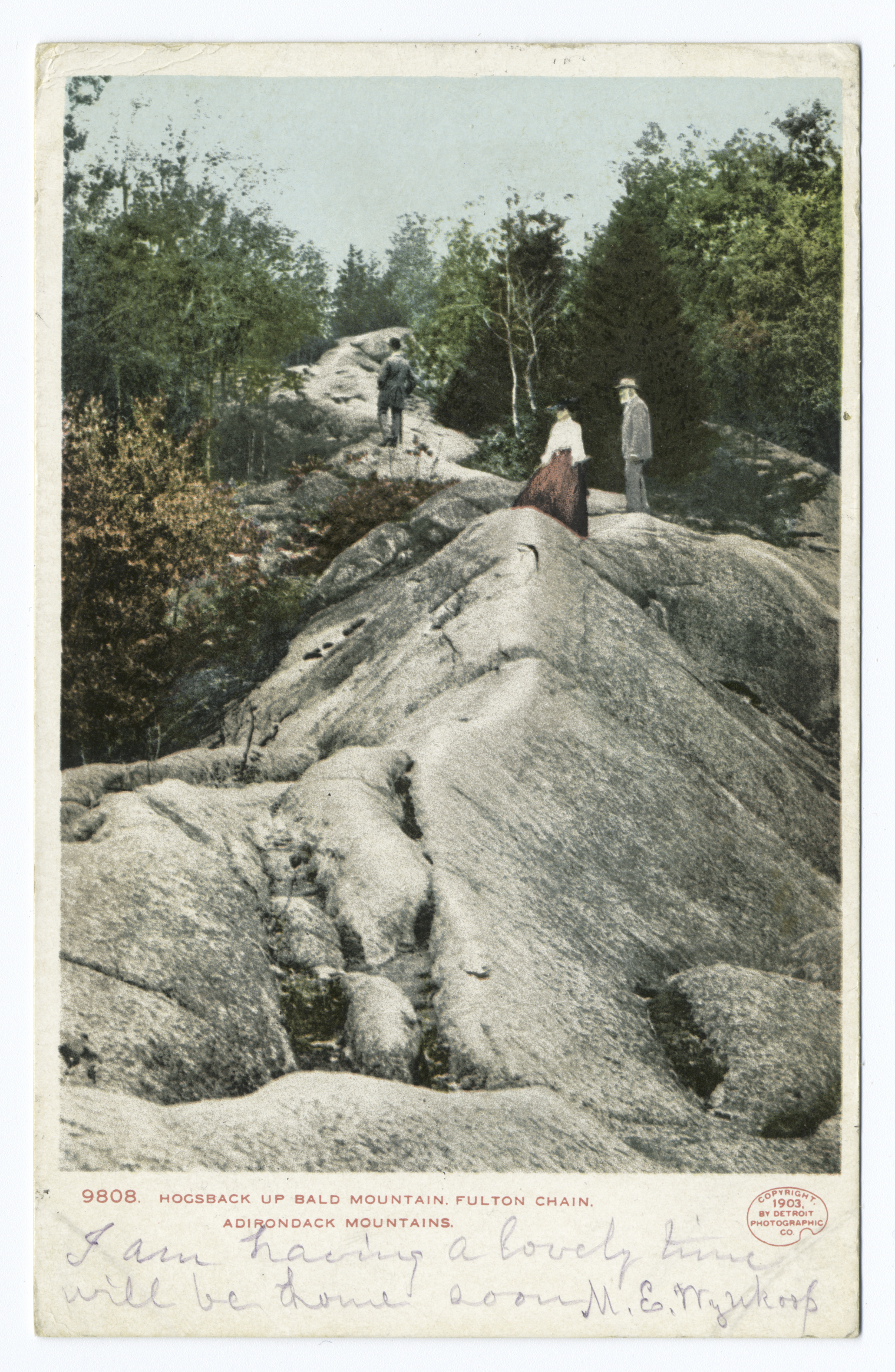
Hogsback up Bald Mountain, in the Adirondacks of New York

Dinosaur Ridge is a well known hogback that is part of Morrison Fossil Area National Natural Landmark within Morrison, Colorado. It is a hogback formed by the differential erosion of well-cemented sandstones of the Cretaceous Dakota Formation, which form the dip slope of this hogback, overlying the less erosion-resistant and interbedded mudstone, siltstone, and thinly-bedded sandstones of the Morrison Formation of Jurassic age. Dinosaur Ridge is only a short segment of the Dakota Hogback that extends the length of the Front Range from Wyoming to southern Colorado.

The Grand Hogback is a 70-mile long (110 km) ridge located in western Colorado. It marks part of the boundary between the Colorado Plateau to the west and the Southern Rocky Mountains to the east.

==== Black Hills ====
While most hogbacks snake along a surface in a relatively sinuous line, a few, such as those in Sundance, Wyoming, encircle a dome. The Dakota Sandstone Hogback encircles the Black Hills, an elliptical dome spanning from northwestern South Dakota to northeastern Wyoming. The Black Hills are approximately 125 miles (201 km) long and 65 miles (105 km) wide. The Dakota Hogback ridge formed when the resistant sandstones of the Dakota Sandstone and underlying strata were uplifted near the center of the present-day Black Hills because of a granite intrusion, approximately 60 million years ago. The Black Hills are the easternmost segment of the Laramide orogeny. The Dakota hogback rim separates the surrounding flat plains from the two-mile wide (3.2 km) Red Valley trench of the Black Hills. The ridge "presents a steep face towards the valley and rises several hundred feet above it.

Green Mountain, also known as the Little Sundance Dome, is found just east of Sundance, Wyoming. It is a circular dome about 5,900 feet (1,800 m) across and 4,600 feet (1,400 m) wide surrounded by a rim of triangular hogbacks (similar in appearance to flatirons). Green Mountain itself, much like the nearby Black Hills, is a laccolith formed by the intrusion of magma into the Earth's crust.

== See also ==
- Flatiron (geomorphology) – Steeply sloping triangular landform
- Flatirons – Rock formations near Boulder, Colorado, US
