= Time Hill =

- Gruen Watch Company-Time Hill
- U.S. National Register of Historic Places
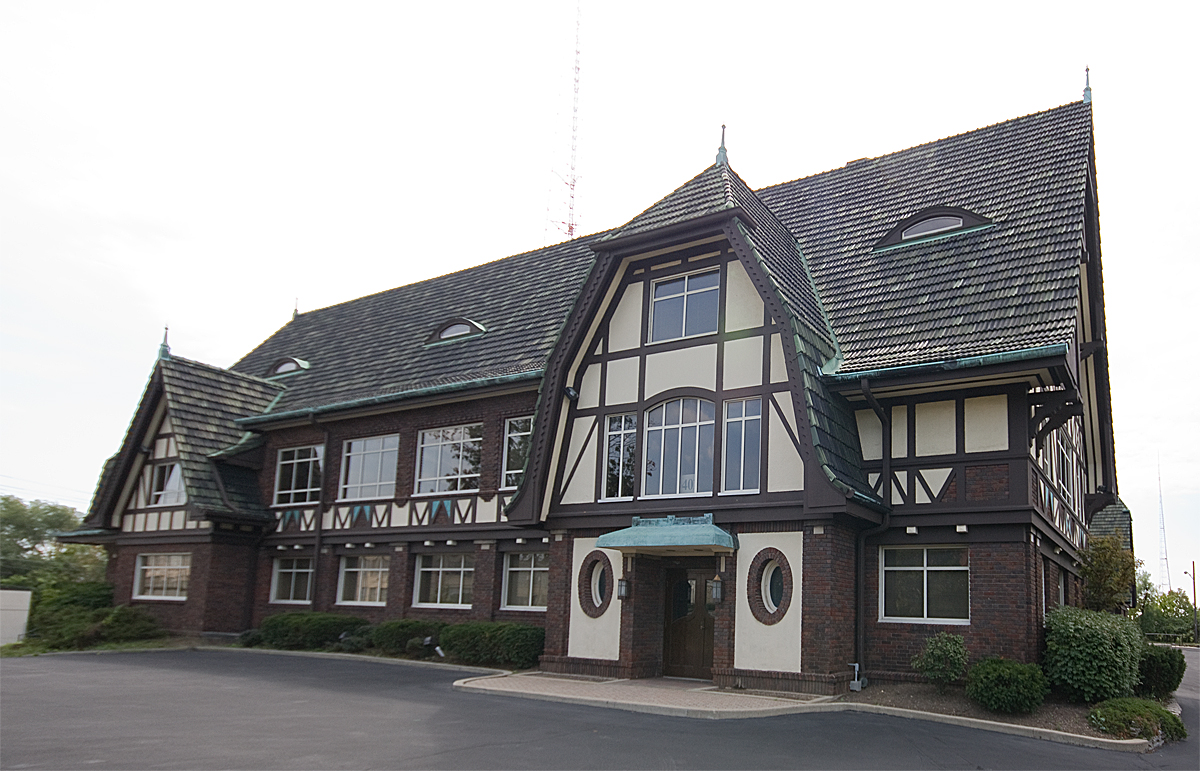
- North facade

- Location within Ohio Location within the United States
- Location: 401 East McMillan Street, Cincinnati, Ohio
- Coordinates: 39°7′33″N 84°30′6″W
- Area: 0.2 acres (0.081 ha)
- Built: 1916
- Architect: Guy Channing Burroughs; Burroughs and Deeken
- Architectural style: Tudor Revival
- NRHP reference No.: 96000219
- Added to NRHP: February 29, 1996

Time Hill, the former offices of the Gruen Watch Company, is a historic building in Cincinnati, Ohio, United States.

When completed in 1916, Time Hill was divided primarily into large rooms in which watchmakers sat at manufacturing desks under high ceilings with visible beams. The grand lobby, two stories tall, featured a mahogany staircase and a fireplace covered with Rookwood tile. The building sits elevated from McMillan Street, with a steep gabled roof parallel to the street and brick walls covered with half-timbering. The roof is ceramic tile and the structure is surrounded by an asphalt parking lot. A modern two-story addition adjoins the southeast portion of the original structure. Because of the grade differences, most of the addition is concealed.

During the 1990s, Time Hill was occupied by an insurance firm, which subjected the building to an abortive attempt to create a modern office complex in the interior; nearly all of the interior was removed and replaced with new styling. After the venture failed, the building was sold at sheriff's sale to Union Institute & University, which already owned the similarly styled Procter and Collier-Beau Brummell Building across the street; a primarily online university, Union was outgrowing its space in the Brummell Building and bought Time Hill with intentions of converting it into the university's headquarters. In 2008, the university sold the building to Lighthouse Youth Services.

In 1996, Time Hill was listed on the National Register of Historic Places, qualifying both because of its place in local history and because of its historically significant architecture. The adjacent Brummell Building was given the same honor twelve years earlier.
