= Greene High School =

Greene High School may refer to:

- Eastern Greene High School, Greene County, Indiana
- Greene Central High School, Greene County, North Carolina
- Greene High School (New York), Greene, New York
- South Greene High School, Greeneville, Tennessee
- North Greene High School, Greene County, Tennessee
- West Greene High School (Pennsylvania), Greene County, Pennsylvania
- West Greene High School (Tennessee), Mosheim, Tennessee

== See also ==
- Green High School (disambiguation)
