= Greens =

Greens may refer to:

- Leaf vegetables such as collard greens, mustard greens, spring greens, winter greens, spinach, etc.

== Politics ==
=== Supranational ===
- Green politics
- Green party, political parties adhering to Green politics
- Global Greens
- European Green Party
- Greens–European Free Alliance

=== Established parties ===
- Green Party (disambiguation)
- The Greens (disambiguation)

=== Other ===
- Green Party of the United States
- Australian Greens
- Green armies, peasant-based groups participating in the Russian Civil War of 1917–23
- Green Movement (disambiguation)
- The Greens, an early 20th-century nationalist and separatist political and military movement in Montenegro
- Greens, a political faction and associated chariot-racing team in the Byzantine empire; involved in the deadly Nika riots of 532

== Places ==
- Greens Farms, Connecticut, United States
- Greens Ledge Light on Long Island Sound, United States
- Greens Norton village in Northamptonshire, England
- Greens Pool beach on the south coast of Western Australia
- Greens Restaurant in San Francisco, California, United States
- Millennium Greens and Doorstep Greens, locally owned and managed public spaces in England
- Breckenridge Greens (Edmonton), Potter Greens, Suder Greens - neighbourhoods in Alberta, Canada

== In sport ==
- Ashland Greens basketball team in Pennsylvania, United States
- Bentleigh Greens soccer team in a suburb of Melbourne, Victoria, Australia
- Baywood Greens public golf club in Long Neck, Delaware, United States
- Greens Worldwide sports management company
- Greens (golf), the very closely mown areas of a golf course around the holes, maintained by a Greenskeeper

== Manufacturing ==
- A British brand of railway locomotives, road rollers and other products; see Thomas Green & Son

== See also ==
- Green (disambiguation)
