= Olipop =

American beverage company

Olipop, Inc.
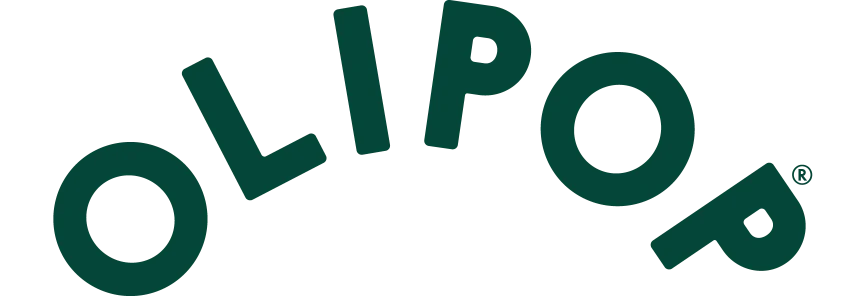

- A can of Olipop Strawberry Vanilla
- Type: Private
- Industry: Beverage
- Founded: 2018
- Founders: Ben Goodwin; David Lester
- Headquarters: Oakland, California (USA)
- Revenue: ▲US$400 million (2024)
- Website: drinkolipop.com

Olipop (stylized as OLIPOP) is a prebiotic soft drink produced in the United States. It is sold by over 65,000 retailers nationwide, and the company was valued at $1.85 billion as of February 2025. The drink's marketing claims that it improves gut health.

The brand name is a portmanteau of the prebiotic fiber oligosaccharide ("oli") and "pop", a common U.S. term for a soft drink. The company was founded in 2018 by Ben Goodwin and David Lester.

== History ==
=== Background ===
In 2000, Ben Goodwin and a friend launched Kombucha Botanica, a kombucha startup. In 2008, Goodwin left the startup and began developing Obi, a probiotic soft drink based on water kefir. Working with a microbiologist in a makeshift laboratory, Goodwin invested about $300,000 of his own money into the project, which launched in 2012. In 2013, Goodwin partnered with David Lester, who had recently resigned from his job at Diageo. The pair operated Obi until 2016, when they sold the brand for an undisclosed amount after it failed to gain traction.

=== Olipop ===
In 2018, Goodwin and Lester founded Olipop with an initial investment of $100,000, taken from the sale of Obi. The drink was first released in three flavors: ginger lemon, strawberry vanilla, and cinnamon cola. It was sold in 40 grocery stores in Northern California, generating $852,000 in gross revenue during its first year. The company secured $2.5 million in seed funding in 2019 and later expanded its retail presence to Target and Walmart stores.

A Series B funding round in 2022 raised $39.7 million from investors including Gwyneth Paltrow, Mindy Kaling, and the Jonas Brothers, bringing Olipop's total funding to $55.4 million by January 2023. The company reached $73.4 million in gross revenue in 2022, a 223% annual increase, and achieved $100 million in gross revenue in the first half of 2023. In 2023, sales of Olipop's root beer flavor surpassed those of A&W. In 2025, the company raised $50 million in a Series C funding round, valuing the company at $1.85 billion, by which time the brand had achieved profitability and expanded its distribution to over 50,000 stores.

In 2022, Olipop created a banana cream flavor branded with Minions characters. In 2024, the company introduced a shelf-stable variant of its product line containing a different blend of soluble fiber ingredients as compared to the refrigerated variant. In the same year, the company collaborated with Mattel to create a peaches and cream flavor themed around Barbie. The flavor Pineapple Paradise was released in 2025 in a cross-marketing campaign for The SpongeBob Movie: Search for SquarePants. In 2026, Olipop expanded into products other than beverages, partnering with Grüns to release Strawberry Vanilla Superfoods Greens Gummies and launching a line of flavor-themed lip balms.

== Operations ==
As of August 2025, Olipop has approximately 373 employees. The workforce is remote. Olipop offers a subscription that sends customers a box of drinks every few weeks. Olipop is only available in the United States and in a limited capacity in Canada. Potential markets include Asia and Australia.

== Flavors ==
Olipop has developed a variety of flavors:

- Citrus Rush (Lemon-Lime-Orange) (formerly Ridge Rush)
- Vintage Cola
- Peaches & Cream
- Classic Root Beer
- Cream Soda
- Classic Grape
- Crisp Apple
- Ginger Ale
- Strawberry Vanilla
- Cherry Cola
- Orange Squeeze
- Lemon Lime
- Ginger Lemon
- Doctor Goodwin
- Watermelon Lime
- Banana Cream
- Cherry Vanilla
- Tropical Punch
- Orange Cream
- Pineapple Paradise
- Shirley Temple
- Blackberry Vanilla
- Raspberry Sherbet
- Pomegranate Sparkle

== See also ==
- Poppi, a competing brand of prebiotic soda
- Slice, another competing brand of prebiotic soda
