= Cuesta =

Hill or ridge with a gentle slope on one side and a steep slope on the other

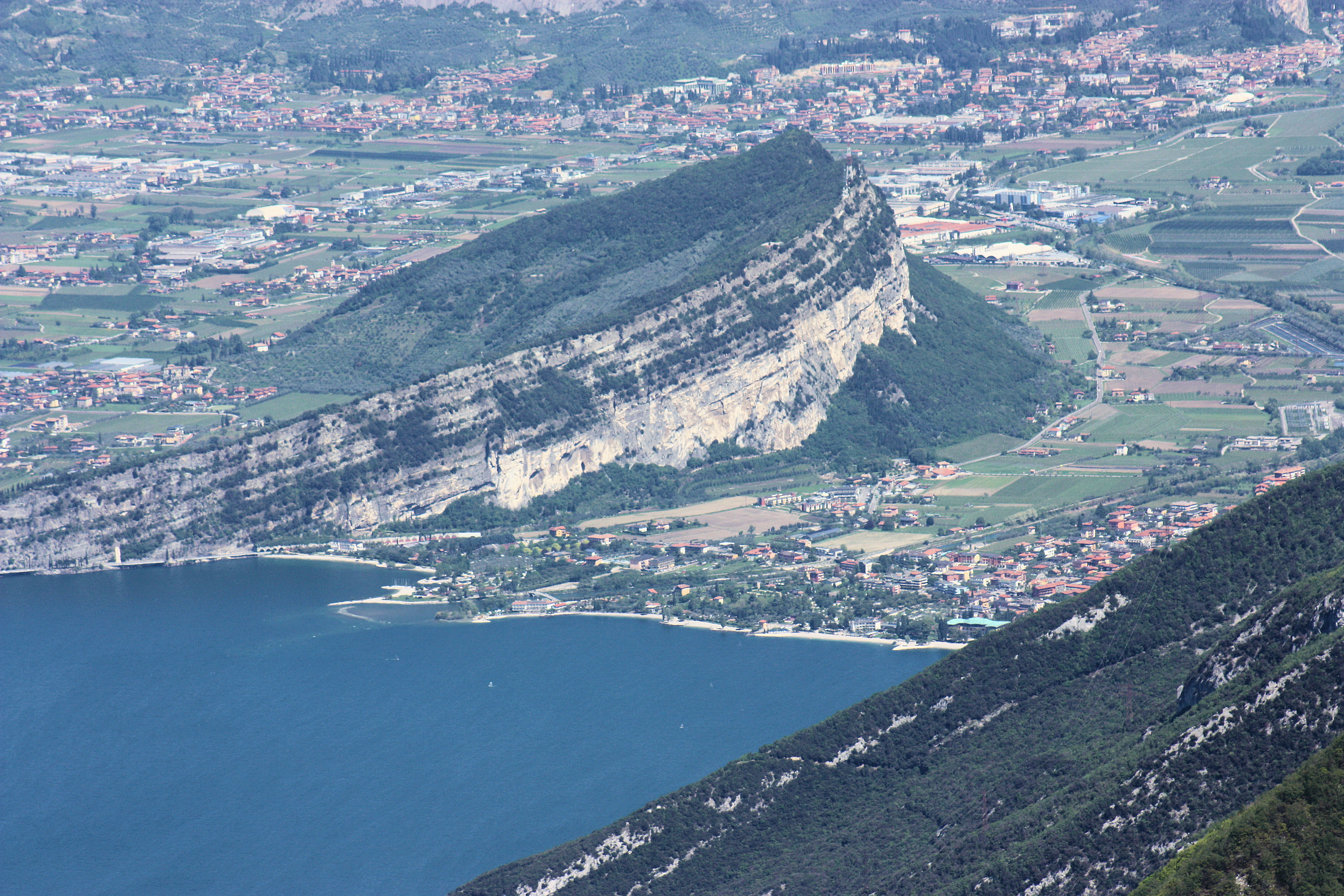
Cuesta in Italy

Schematic cross section of three cuestas, dip slopes facing left, and harder rock layers in darker colors than softer ones

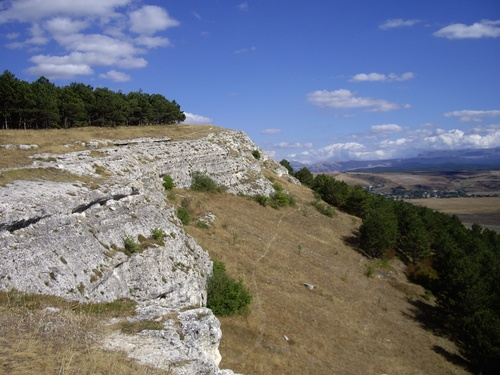
Cuesta in Crimea

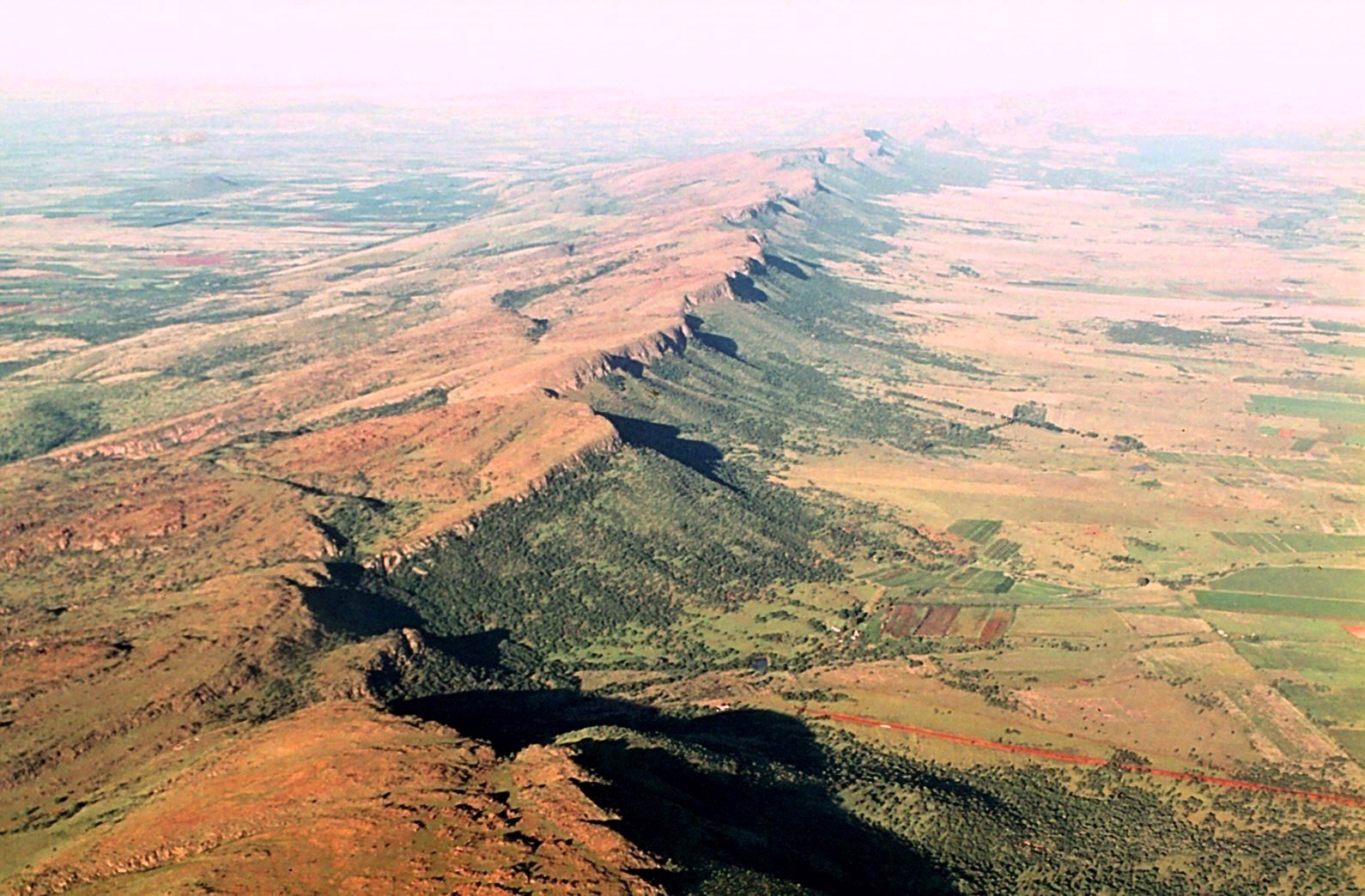
Magaliesberg Range, Transvaal, South Africa

A cuesta (Spanish for 'slope') is a hill or ridge with a gentle slope on one side, and a steep slope on the other. In geology, the term is more specifically applied to a ridge where a harder sedimentary rock overlies a softer layer, the whole being tilted somewhat from the horizontal. This results in a long and gentle backslope called a dip slope that conforms with the dip of resistant strata, called caprock. Where erosion has exposed the frontslope of this, a steep slope or escarpment occurs. The resulting terrain may be called scarpland.

== Definition ==
In general usage, a cuesta is a hill or ridge with a gentle slope (backslope) on one side, and a steep slope (frontslope) on the other. The word is from Spanish: "flank or slope of a hill; hill, mount, sloping ground". In geology and geomorphology, cuesta refers specifically to an asymmetric ridge with a long and gentle backslope called a dip slope that conforms with the dip of a resistant stratum or strata, called caprock. The outcrop of the caprock forms a steeper or even cliff-like frontslope (escarpment), cutting through the dipping strata that comprise the cuesta.

== Formation ==
Cuestas are the expression of extensive outcrops of gently dipping strata, typically sedimentary strata, that consist of alternating beds of weak or loosely cemented strata, e.g. shale, mudstone, and marl and hard, well-lithified strata, e.g. sandstone and limestone. The surfaces of the hard, erosion-resistant rock strata form the caprock of the backslope (dip-slope) of the cuesta, where erosion has preferentially removed the weaker strata. The frontslope of the cuesta consists of an escarpment that cuts across the bedding of the strata comprising it. Because of the gently dipping nature of the strata that forms a cuesta, a significant shift in horizontal location will take place as the landscape is lowered by erosion. Because the slope of a cuesta dips in the same direction as the sedimentary strata, the dip angle of this bedding (θ) can be calculated by (v / h) = tan(θ) where v is equal to the vertical distance and h is equal to the horizontal distance perpendicular to the strike of the beds.

Cuestas, homoclinal ridges, and hogbacks comprise a sequence of landforms that form a gradational continuum. These landforms differ only on the steepness of their backslopes and the relative differences in the inclination of their backslopes and frontslopes. These differences depend upon whether the dip of the strata from which they have been eroded are either nearly vertical, moderately dipping, or gently dipping. Because of their gradational nature, the exact angle of the backslope that separates these landforms is arbitrary and some differences in the specific angles used to define these landforms occur in the scientific literature. It also can be difficult to sharply distinguish immediately adjacent members of this series of landforms because of their gradational nature.

== Examples ==
In North America, two well-known cuestas in western/central New York and southern Ontario are the Onondaga escarpment and the Niagara Escarpment. The dip of the Onondaga is about 40 feet per mile (about 7.6 m/km) to the south. In their most populated sections both escarpments edges face north, running roughly parallel to the southern Lake Ontario shoreline and, for the former, the Mohawk River.

The Gulf Coastal Plain in Texas is punctuated by a series of cuestas that parallel the coast, as are most coastal plains. The Reynosa Plateau is the most coast-ward cuesta, which has surface expression with the Bordes-Oakville escarpment, on the northwest side and a low ridge on the eastern boundary, called the Reynosa Cuesta, where the deposits dip below later Pliocene-Pleistocene deposits of the Willis and Lissie Formations.

Cuestas have less dramatic expression in the United Kingdom, with two notable examples being the northwest-facing escarpment of the Cretaceous chalk White Horse Hills and the similarly aligned escarpment of the Jurassic limestones in the Cotswolds, sometimes called the Cotswold Edge. Other examples include the Brecon Beacons, Wenlock Edge, the Chilterns, the North and South Downs and the Greensand Ridge of Kent and Surrey.

In continental Europe, the Swabian Alb offers particularly good views of cuestas in Jurassic rock. In France, the term for a cuesta is the same as for a coastline: côte. Notable French cuestas are the wine-growing regions of Côte d'Or.

Cuestas are very widespread in the Caucasus Mountains' northern part, with each progressive ridge from north to south being taller and steeper on its south side.

The Machinchang Formation outcrops in the Langkawi islands off the coast of northwestern Malaysia. The formation is one of the oldest exposed rock units in Southeast Asia and has an extensive eroded anticline cuesta topography—dating back to Cambrian.

== See also ==
- Flatiron (geomorphology) – Steeply sloping triangular landform
