= Monteverdi (disambiguation) =

Claudio Monteverdi was an Italian composer.

Monteverdi may also refer to:

- Monteverdi (automobile), a Swiss automobile brand
- Monteverdi (horse), an Irish-trained Thoroughbred racehorse
- Monteverdi (crater), a crater on Mercury

== People with the surname ==
- Giulio Cesare Monteverdi, Italian composer, brother of Claudio
- Peter Monteverdi, Swiss automaker

== See also ==
- The Full Monteverdi (film)
- Monte Verde
- Monteverde (disambiguation)
- Monteverdi Choir, a choir founded and conducted by John Eliot Gardiner
