= Green Creek, Nova Scotia =

Community in Nova Scotia, Canada

Coordinates: 45°14′45.96″N 63°23′46.55″W

Green Creek in Nova Scotia

Green Creek is a small community in the Canadian province of Nova Scotia, located in Colchester County.
