= Green Mountain (Boulder, Colorado) =

Mountain in Colorado, United States

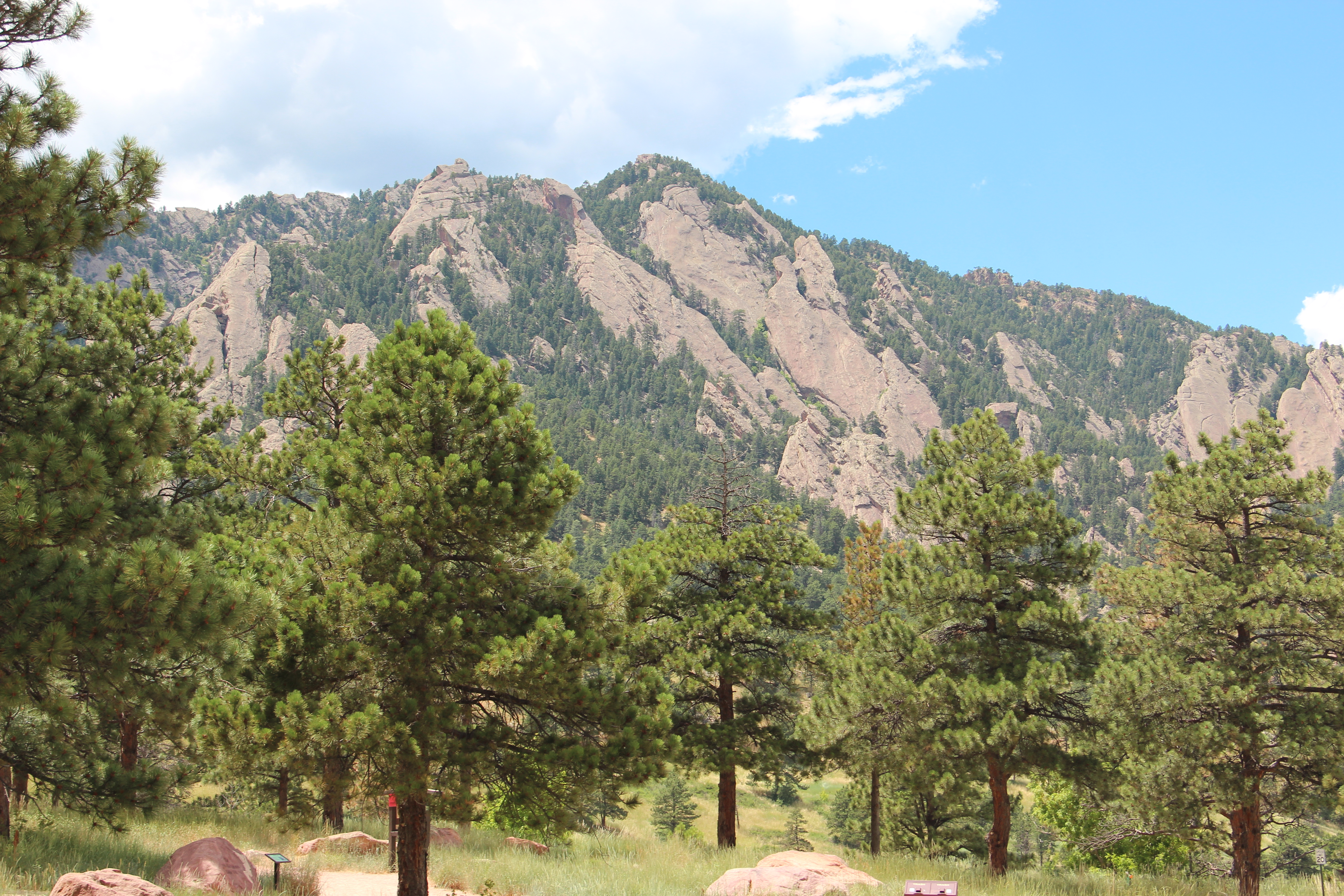
- Green Mountain viewed from NCAR

Highest point
- Elevation: 8,148 ft (2,484 m)
- Prominence: 524 ft (160 m)
- Isolation: 1.55 mi (2.49 km)
- Coordinates: 39°58′46″N 105°18′06″W

Geography
- Location within Colorado
- Location: Boulder County, Colorado, U.S.
- Parent range: Front Range
- Topo map(s): USGS 7.5' topographic map Eldorado Springs, Colorado

Climbing
- Easiest route: hike

Green Mountain is a mountain summit on the eastern flank of the Front Range of the Rocky Mountains of North America. The 8,148-foot (2,484 m) peak is located in Boulder Mountain Park, 4.2 miles (6.8 km) southwest by south (bearing 219°) of downtown Boulder in Boulder County, Colorado, United States. The mountain is renowned for the Flatirons rock formations on its eastern flank.

== See also ==
- List of Colorado mountain ranges
- List of Colorado mountain summits
  - List of Colorado fourteeners
  - List of Colorado 4000 meter prominent summits
  - List of the most prominent summits of Colorado
- List of Colorado county high points
