= Green High School =

Green High School may refer to:

- Green County High School, Greensburg, Kentucky
- Green High School (Franklin Furnace, Ohio)
- Green High School (Green, Ohio)
- Hazel Green High School, Hazel Green, Alabama
- Newall Green High School, Wythenshawe, England

== See also ==
- Greene High School (disambiguation)
