= Green Mountain Lake =

Lake in the state of Minnesota, United States

- Location within Minnesota
- Location: Wright County, Minnesota
- Coordinates: 45°10′N 93°47.5′W
- Type: lake

Green Mountain Lake is a lake in Wright County, in the U.S. state of Minnesota.

Green Mountain Lake was named after the Green Mountains of Vermont, the native state of a share of the early settlers.

== See also ==
- List of lakes in Minnesota
