= Green River Generating Station =

Coal-fired power plant in Kentucky

- Country: United States
- Location: Muhlenberg County, near Central City, Kentucky
- Coordinates: 37°21′51″N 87°07′22″W
- Status: Retired
- Commission date: 1954
- Decommission date: 2015
- Owner: Kentucky Utilities

Thermal power station
- Primary fuel: Bituminous coal
- Cooling source: Green River

Power generation
- Units operational: 2
- Nameplate capacity: 242 MW

The Green River Generating Station was a coal-fired power plant owned and operated by Kentucky Utilities, which was removed from service on 30 September 2015. It was located in Muhlenberg County, Kentucky.

== Emissions data ==
- 2006 CO_{2} Emissions: 1,169,616 tons
- 2006 SO_{2} Emissions:
- 2006 NO_{x} Emissions:
- 2005 Mercury Emissions:

== See also ==
- Coal mining in Kentucky
