= The Green =

The Green may refer to:

- The Green (band), a reggae, pop, and soul band from Hawaii
- The Green (Charlotte, North Carolina), a 1.5-acre park in uptown Charlotte, North Carolina
- The Green (Dartmouth College), a central field at Dartmouth College in Hanover, New Hampshire
- The Green Distillery, an Irish whiskey distillery in Cork City, Ireland
- The Green (film), a 2011 film starring Julia Ormond
- The Green (Frogmore, South Carolina), an NRHP listing in Beaufort County, South Carolina
- The Green, a play by Gary Owen
- The Green, a set of television programming on the Sundance Channel
- The Green, a fictional mystical realm in DC Comics inhabited by the minds of all members of the Parliament of Trees
- St Mary's CBS (The Green), a secondary school in Tralee, Ireland
- The Green railway station, a small railway station on the Ravenglass and Eskdale heritage railway in the Lake District, Cumbria
- The Green, Comber, a cricket ground in Ireland
- The Green, a small village in parish of Thwaites, Cumbria
- The Green, the largest settlement in the civil parish of Millom Without, Cumbria
- The Green, Essex, a hamlet in the civil parish of White Notley
- The Green, Wiltshire, a hamlet in the civil parish of East Knoyle
- A number of other locations in England
- The Green is also a common road name in England, often in the vicinity of a village or town green

== See also ==
- Dartmouth Big Green
- Green (disambiguation)
