= Flatiron (geomorphology) =

Steeply sloping triangular landform

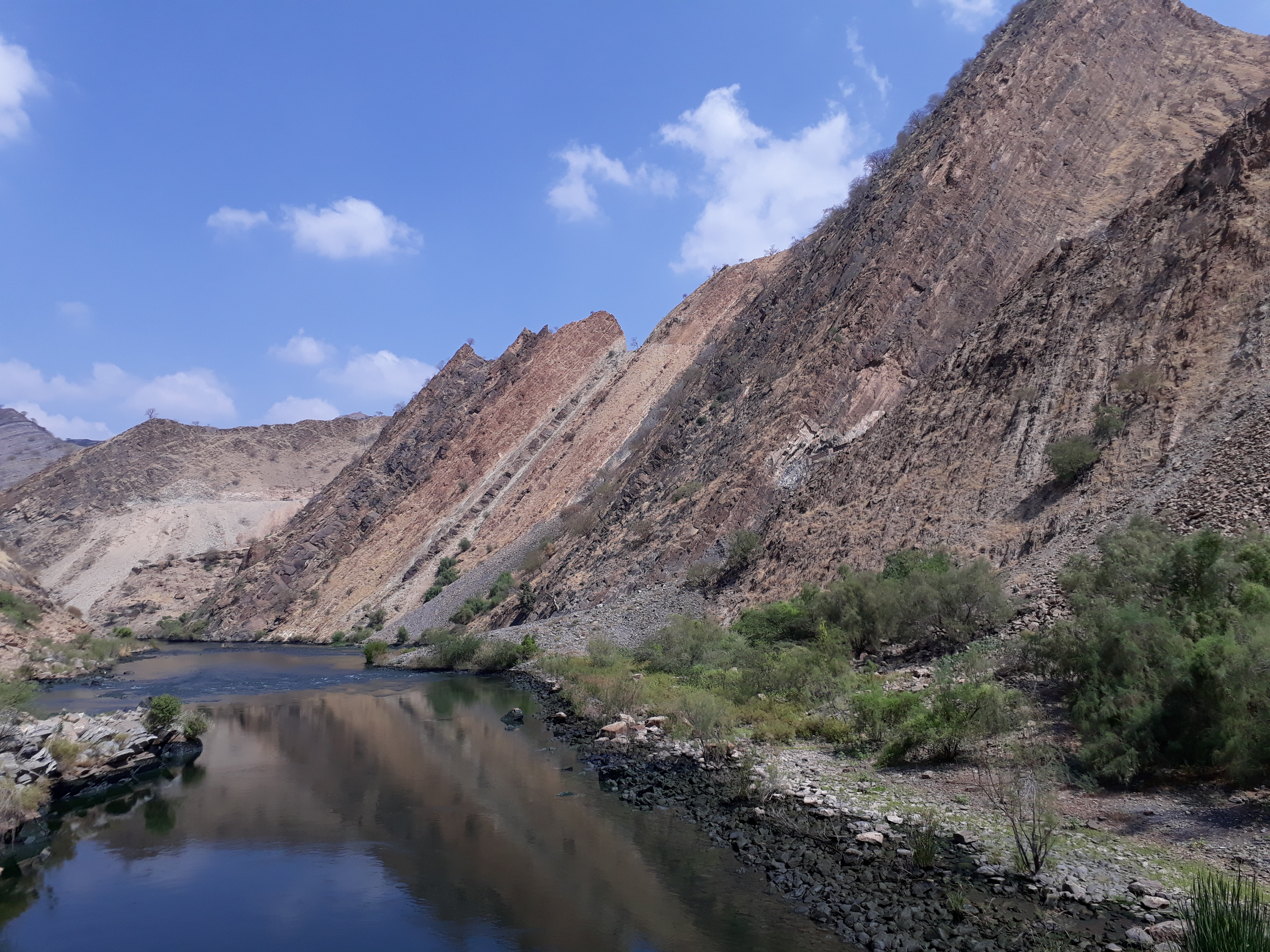
Lateral view on flatirons along Tekeze River, Ethiopia

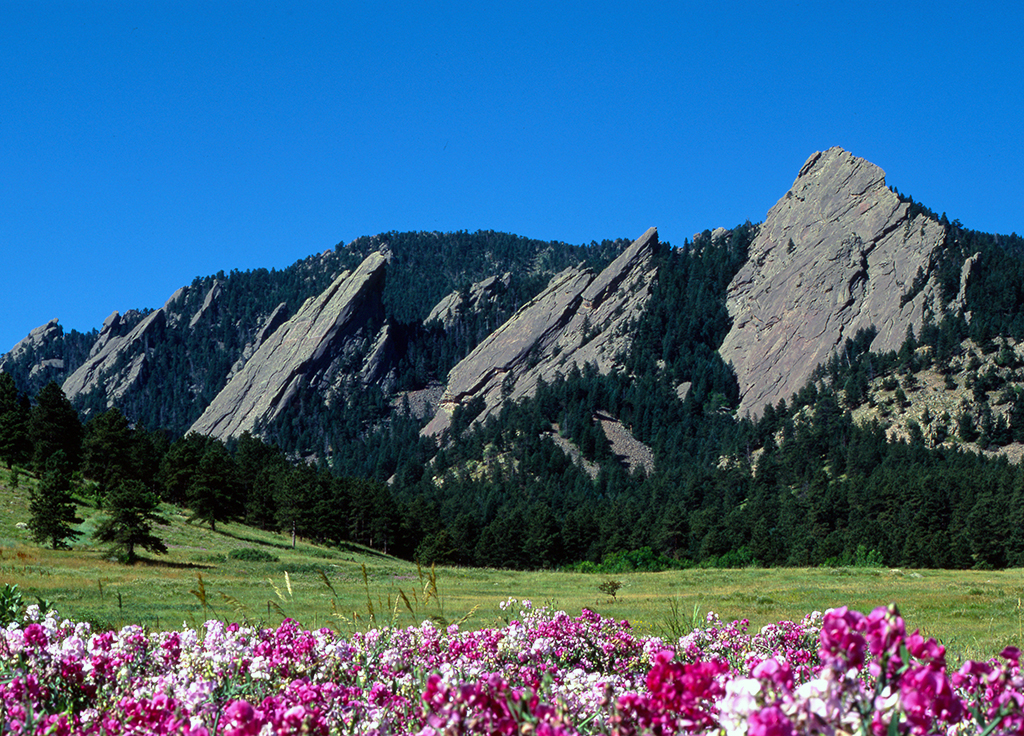
The Flatirons (prominences and flat slopes) overlooking Boulder, Colorado

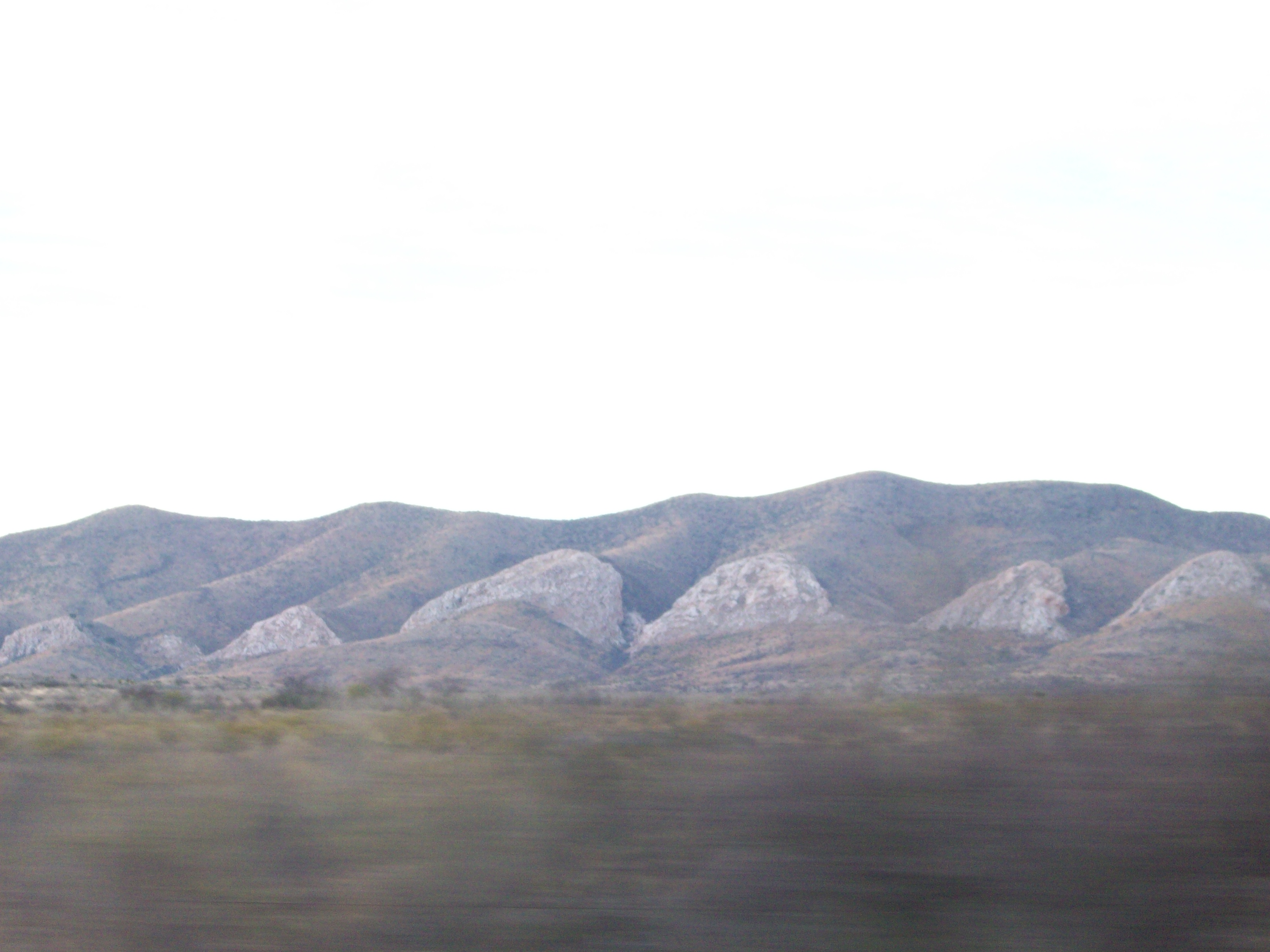
Novaculite flatirons on the flank of East Bourland Mountain in the Marathon Uplift of West Texas

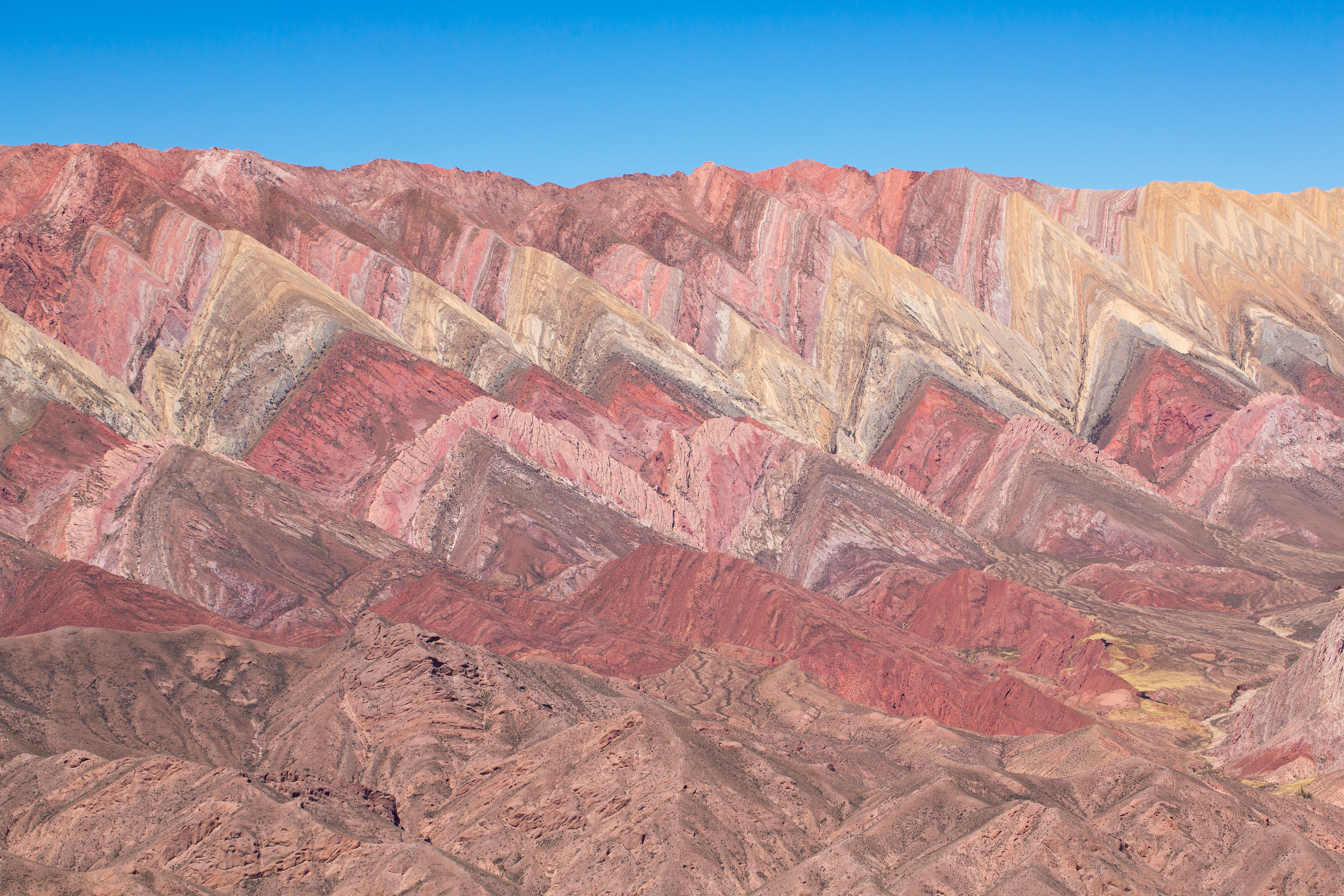
Colourful flatirons in the Serranía de Hornocal of Jujuy Province, Argentina

Traditionally in geomorphology, a flatiron is a steeply sloping triangular landform created by the differential erosion of a steeply dipping, erosion-resistant layer of rock overlying softer strata. Flatirons have wide bases that form the base of a steep, triangular facet that narrows upward into a point at its summit. The dissection of a hogback by regularly spaced streams often results in the formation of a series of flatirons along the strike of the rock layer that formed the hogback. As noted in some, but not all definitions, a number of flatirons are perched upon the slope of a larger mountain with the rock layer forming the flatiron inclined in the same direction as, but often at a steeper angle than the associated mountain slope. The name flatiron refers to their resemblance to an upended, household flatiron.

== Background ==
The Flatirons near Boulder, Colorado, is both an example of these landforms and the source of their name. Other well-developed flatirons are found in the eastern Uinta Mountains in northwestern Colorado, the Waterpocket Fold in Capitol Reef National Park, the Superstition Mountains near Phoenix, Arizona, and on the flanks of the Marathon Uplift in west Texas.

The term "flatiron" is also used for very small-scale landforms that are known as pediment flatirons and talus flatirons. These landforms are small knolls with a triangular to trapezoidal-shaped sloping surface with the long side of this surface as their base and a point at their top. Both pediment flatirons and talus flatirons are associated with the scarps of a cuesta, mesa, or butte and with their tips directed towards the scarp. Both types of these flatirons are typically separated from the scarp by well-defined ravines and gullies. These flatirons consist of either talus, in the case of the talus flatirons, or pedisediment and colluvium that cover pediments, in the case of pediment flatirons. Their surfaces are protected by a thin layer of caprock. The caprock commonly consists of caliche, which is about 2 meters (6.6 ft) thick and rarely as much as 5 meters (16 ft) thick, that has developed in either talus, pedisediment, or colluvium. Talus flatirons lie within the scarp slope – and pediment flatirons occur within the transition zone between scarp and foreland. Pediment flatirons can merge downward into a fluvial terrace. Both talus and pediment flatirons are the relict remnants of formerly active slope systems that were once part of the scarp's history.

== See also ==
- Cuesta – Hill or ridge with a gentle slope on one side and a steep slope on the other
