= Grün =

Grün (sometimes transliterated as Gruen) is a German surname, literally meaning "green" and is derived either from a nickname or after a dwelling place. There is a Franconian noble von der Grün family.

- Anastasius Grün, pseudonym of Count Anton Alexander von Auersperg (1806–1876), Austrian poet and liberal politician
- Anselm Grün, German Benedictine friar
- Arno Gruen, German psychologist and psychoanalyst
- David Grün, birth name of politician David Ben-Gurion, first Prime Minister of Israel
- Derek Gruen, birth name of musician Del Marquis, guitarist, Scissor Sisters
- Dick Grune, computer scientist
- Dietrich Gruen, founder of the Gruen Watch Company
- Eberhard Grün, German planetary scientist
- Erich S. Gruen, American classicist and ancient historian
- Fred Gruen, Australian economist, an early and influential voice in favour of free trade and tariff reductions in the 1960s and 1970s
- Frederick G. Gruen, son of Dietrich Gruen, player in Gruen Watch Company
- George J. Gruen, son of Dietrich Gruen, player in the Gruen Watch Company
- Georges Grün, football player and TV presenter
- Jakob Grün (1837–1916), Austrian violinist of Hungarian origin
- John Jonas Gruen (1926–2016), American art critic, author, photographer, composer
- Jules-Alexandre Grün, French painter
- Karl Theodor Ferdinand Grün, German political theorist
- Max von der Grün (1926–2005), German writer
- Otto Grün (1888–1974), German mathematician
- Sara Gruen, Canadian author
- Stefan Grun, Australian football umpire
- Victor Gruen (1903–1980), Austrian-born American architect
