= George J. Gruen =

American watchmaker

- Born: 1877; Ohio
- Died: 1953 (aged 75–76)
- Occupation: watchmaker

George J. Gruen (1877–1953) was an American watchmaker who managed the Gruen Watch Co. He was the second son of the founder Dietrich Gruen.
