= Gruen Watch Company =

American watch manufacturer (1894–1958)

Coordinates: 39.12654°N 84.50047°W

- Type: Gruen Watch Co.
- Founded: 1894 in Cincinnati, Ohio, United States
- Key people: Dietrich Gruen
- Products: Watches

The Gruen Watch Company was formerly one of the largest watch manufacturers in the United States. It was in business from about 1894 to 1958 and was based in Cincinnati, Ohio. It was founded in 1894 by German-born watchmaker Dietrich Grün, who changed the spelling of his name to "Gruen" because the letter ü does not exist in English.

== History ==
=== Dietrich Gruen ===
Dietrich Gruen, was born in Germany in 1847. At 15 years of age, he was sent away from home to become a watchmaker's apprentice. Later he worked for three years in Switzerland before going to the United States. In 1874, he took out a patent for a safety pinion U.S. patent 157,913 for pocket watches, which prevented damage to the watch movement if the watch's mainspring broke.

=== Columbus Watch Manufacturing Company ===
In partnership with W.J. Savage, the son of a prominent Columbus, Ohio, watchmaker and businessman, Dietrich Gruen started the Columbus Watch Manufacturing Company in 1876. Initially, the company imported and finished watch movements imported from Madretsch, a suburb of Biel/Bienne, Switzerland. The movements featured Gruen's 1874 safety pinion design.

=== Columbus Watch Company ===
In 1882 the company was refinanced and reorganized under the new name “Columbus Watch Company” and started manufacturing their own movements directly in the U.S.A. During the Panic of 1893 the shareholders forced Gruen out of the company. Reincorporated as the New Columbus Watch Company, the firm continued in existence until 1903.

=== D. Gruen & Son ===
In 1894, Dietrich Gruen founded a new company D. Gruen & Son, a partnership with his son Frederick G. Gruen. Father and son designed a series of pocket watch movements which were manufactured by the German watchmaking firm of Paul Assmann, and incorporated with an escapement designed by Moritz Grossman.

=== D. Gruen & Sons ===
In 1897, the name was modified again, as another son, George J. Gruen became an additional partner. The company moved in 1898 to Cincinnati.

=== D. Gruen, Sons & Co. ===
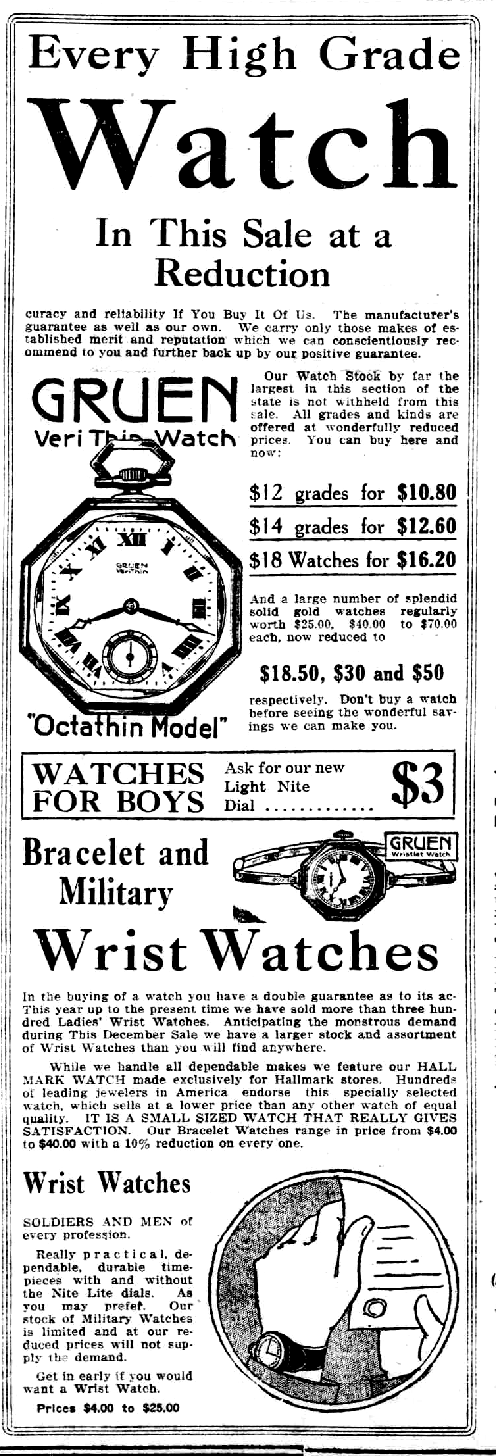
Gruen watch ad from 1917.

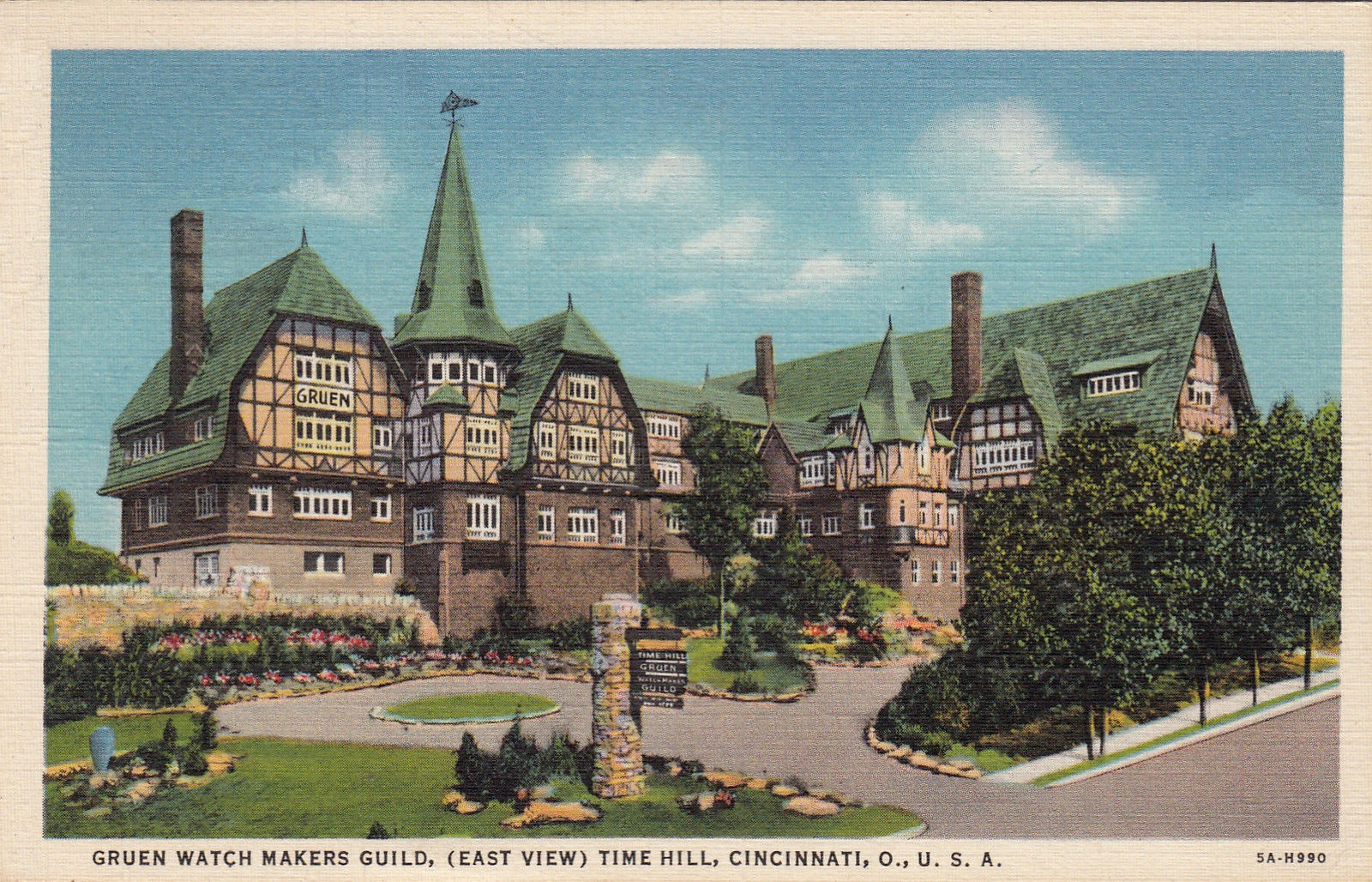
Time Hill in Cincinnati (1937)

In 1900 the corporate name became D. Gruen, Sons & Co. The new company became partially a Swiss company. The movements were no longer made in Glashütte, Germany, but in Switzerland again. 1903, a subsidiary was formed, “The Gruen Watch Manufacturing Company”, located in Biel/Bienne, Switzerland.

Gruen was one of the first US watch companies to offer basic movements produced in Switzerland, in a wide variety of cases and prices, but adjusted, dialled and cased in the United States. Some of their finest movements were made by Jean Aegler, who later became a business partner of Hans Wilsdorf, of Rolex.

In 1904, the company introduced the VeriThin pocket watch movement, a new arrangement of components that allowed the movement to be made much thinner.

The first Gruen wristwatches were introduced in 1908. These found favor with women buyers, but were not popular with men at the time (who considered wristwatches feminine). The company did not return to making wristwatches for men until World War I, when military use made wristwatches acceptable for men to wear.

Dietrich Gruen died in 1911, and control of the company passed to his son Frederick.

In 1917 the company moved to a newly constructed building named Time Hill, located at 401 East McMillan Street in Cincinnati. The building, which still exists, was designed to look like a medieval guild hall. In about 1922, the company built the Precision Factory in Biel/Bienne, Switzerland. From this point on, all of the company's higher-quality movements were manufactured in the new factory.

=== The Gruen Watch Company ===
In 1922 a consolidation took place where the D. Gruen, Sons & Co, Cincinnati, The Gruen Watch Manufacturing Co, Biel/Bienne and the Gruen National Watch Case Co, were merged into “The Gruen Watch Company”. In 1923 the company moved into a new facility, in Biel/Bienne.

In marketing and advertising, the Gruen Watch Company used 1876, and later, 1874, as its official founding date. The 1876 date is actually the founding date of the Columbus Watch Company, and the 1874 date is actually the year that Dietrich Gruen's first patent was issued.

By the mid-twenties, Gruen’s sales had reached over five million dollars. In total sales, it had become the largest watch company in the U.S., as well as first in the average watch price.

In 1930 Gruen introduced the Baguette watches.

After the start of the Depression, 1930 an arrangement was made with Alpina, with the production of a dual branded Alpina/Gruen watch.

By 1935, the company was $1.8 million in debt. That year, Gruen introduced the first Curvex wristwatches for men, the company's most famous design. Expanding on the then-current fashion for long, rectangular wristwatch shapes, these models were curved to wrap around the wearer's wrist. The biggest innovation of the design was the ability to produce a movement which followed the shape of the case, allowing the watch to be thinner and more curved. This, in turn, allowed the movement to be larger, more durable and more accurate than would have been possible if a smaller, flat movement was used. A year later, the company introduced Curvex models for women.

During World War II, the Time Hill factory stopped making watches and instead worked exclusively for the U.S. military, manufacturing gauges and instruments for aircraft, ships and submarines. The company also made precision gauges used for delicate surgical instruments and for radios and other electronic equipment. During World War II, some watches were still manufactured at the Precision Factory in Switzerland and imported.

The president of the company, Benjamin S. Katz, had joined the War Production Board by December 1942. It received an Army-Navy E Award in October 1944.

It was during and shortly after World War II that many American watch companies began to lose market share to Swiss imports. Many American watch companies began to move manufacturing to Switzerland in the 1940s and 1950s, while Gruen, who had always manufactured watch movements in Germany or Switzerland, launched the '21' series of wristwatches (named for their 21-jewel movements) which were entirely made in the United States.

The Gruen family sold their interest in the company in 1953, and the firm was broken up and sold in 1958. The watch manufacturing business moved to New York under new ownership, and manufacturing was done exclusively in Switzerland.

The operation in Biel/Bienne closed its doors in 1977; their building was bought by their former supplier, J. Aegler and is now used in Rolex manufacturing.

=== New ownership (2000–current) ===
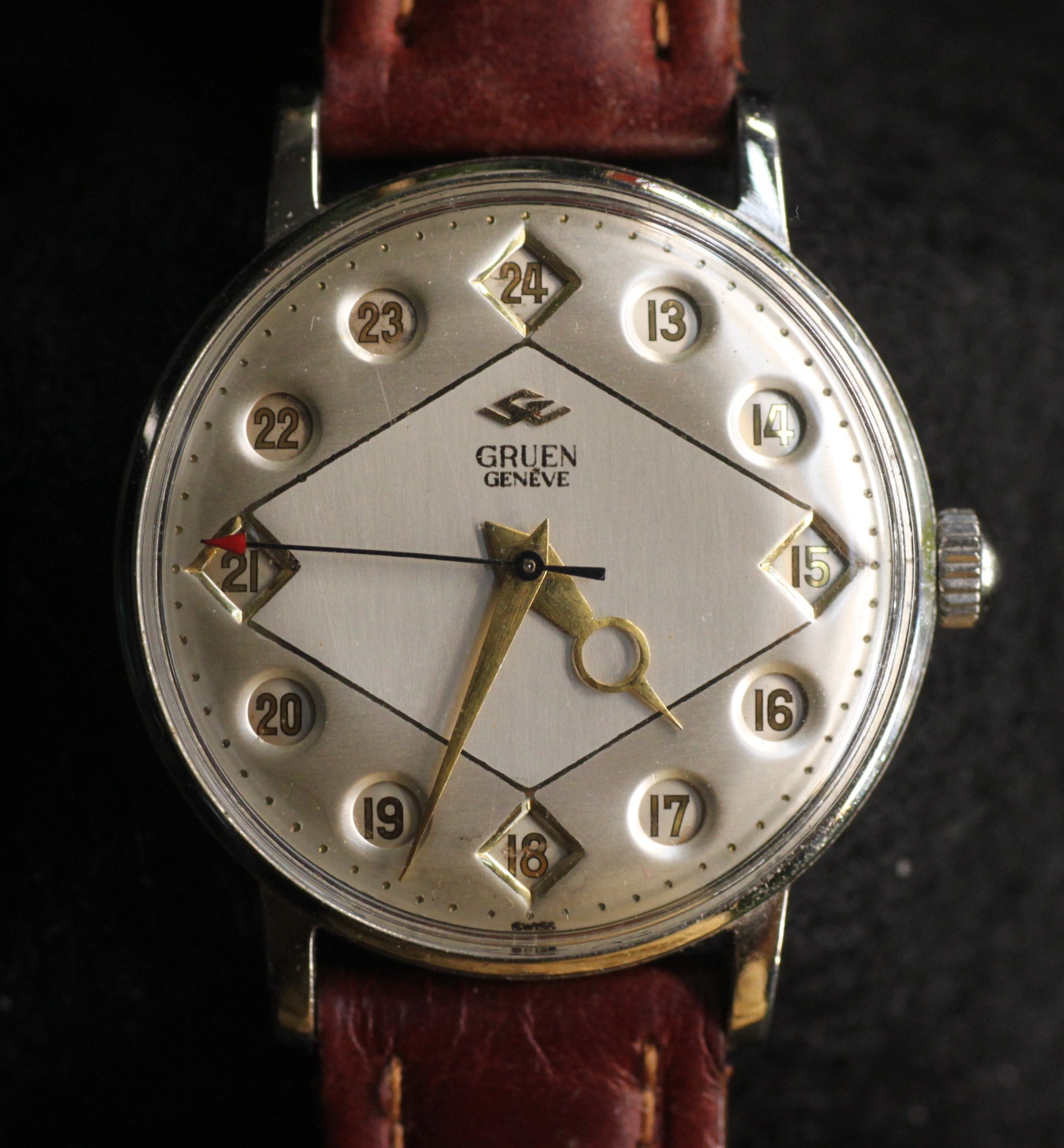
Airflight Jump Hour 24h rotating dial, 1960–1965

The Gruen trademark is currently owned worldwide by MZ Berger, Long Island City, Queens, New York.

== Notable models ==
A Gruen Precision 510 is rumoured to be the first watch worn on screen by James Bond (played by Sean Connery) in the 1962 film Dr No, and subsequently in From Russia With Love, Goldfinger, You Only Live Twice and Diamonds Are Forever.

== See also ==
- Elgin Watch Company
- Waltham Watch Company
- Hamilton Watch Company
- Pulsar
