= Green Nwankwo =

Nigerian scholar and traditional ruler

Green Onyekaba Nwankwo is a Nigerian scholar and traditional ruler who has authored many books about banking and finance in Nigeria. One of his books, The Nigerian Financial System published in 1980 is a foundational book on post-colonial banking, insurance, money and capital markets in Nigeria.

Nwankwo served as the pioneer head of the Finance Department of University of Lagos and played a principal role in organizing the department. In 1977, he became the Executive Director in charge of banking and monetary policy in Central Bank of Nigeria.

Nwankwo has led a few organizations such as the Nigerian-Greece Chamber of Commerce and Technology and the Chartered Institute of Bankers of Nigeria.

== Life ==
Nwankwo was born in 1933 and raised in a humble household, his father was a farmer and palm wine tapper. As a young boy he lived with a Christian uncle and with his uncle's support, he attended St Peters CMS Central School, Ndiawa Arondizuogu for his primary education. Upon completion of studies in 1945, he briefly worked as a pupil teacher before continuing with secondary school education.

He later obtained his undergraduate degree in economics from University of Strathclyde. Sponsored by a Nigerian government scholarship, he earned his degree within three years and subsequently started his graduate program after receiving encouragement from his lecturers. He obtained his masters and doctorate degree from London School of Economics and the School of Oriental and African Studies respectively, his Ph.D. thesis, Foreign private investment in Nigerian Manufacturing, 1939 to 1965, was written under the principal supervision of Edith Penrose.

Nwankwo began his banking career in 1951 working as a clerk at a Port Harcourt branch of Bank of British West Africa. He spent nine years at the bank before resigning his position.

Upon completion of his doctorate degree in 1967, Nwankwo was unable to return to Nigeria as the Civil War had just begun. He decided to stay in London and eke out a living as a lecturer at City of London College. He taught at the college for five years until he returned to Nigeria in 1972 when he was recruited to start a department of finance at University of Lagos, sponsored by the United Bank for Africa. In Nigeria, Nwankwo called for a post-colonial review of the Nigerian financial system and adoption of practices that was easily adaptable to the peculiarities of indigenous values and systems. In 1974, he became the UBA professor in Finance and taught in Lagos until 1978, when he was appointed Deputy Governor of the Central Bank of Nigeria. In 1980, he wrote Money and Capital Markets in Nigeria, a banking and finance textbook for both students and bankers.

Nwankwo was chairman of Union Bank of Nigeria from 1990 to 1996 and African Continental Bank from 2001 to 2005.

== Works ==
- Nwankwo, G.O. (1980). The Nigerian financial system. London: Macmillan. ISBN 978-0333256848.
- Nwankwo, Nwankwo, G. (1990). Prudential regulation of Nigerian banking. Lagos: University of Lagos Press. ISBN 978-9780170141.
- Nwankwo, G. (1991). Money and capital markets in Nigeria today. Lagos: University of Lagos Press. ISBN 978-9780170295.
- O., Nwankwo, G. (2001). Readings in banking and finance in Nigeria. Lagos: Evergreen Associates. ISBN 978-9783588578.
