= Parti écologiste "Les Verts" v European Parliament =

EU law case on political party funding

Parti écologiste “Les Verts” v European Parliament
- Court: European Court of Justice
- Citations: (1986) Case 294/83, [1986] ECR 1339

Keywords
- Constitution, political parties, rule of law

Parti écologiste “Les Verts” v European Parliament (1986) Case 294/83 is an EU law case, concerning the constitutional framework, and party political funding, in the European Union. The case is significant for being the first to suggest that the European Union is based on the "rule of law", and has been described as "legendary".

== Facts ==
The Green Party challenged political party funding from the Parliament. They claimed the system was unfair in distribution against newer parties. They sought a declaration that the European Community was not entitled to give funding for political parties.

== Judgment ==
The Court of Justice held the matter of party political funding should be regarded as one which is entirely for the member states to decide under the Treaty on the Functioning of the European Union article 7(2) of the Act of 20 September 1976 Concerning the Election of the Representatives of the Assembly Direct Universal Suffrage.

23. It must first be emphasized in this regard that the European Economic Community is a Community based on the rule of law, inasmuch as neither its Member States nor its institutions can avoid a review of the question whether the measures adopted by them are in conformity with the basic constitutional charter, the Treaty. In particular, (...) the Treaty established a complete system of legal remedies and procedures designed to permit the Court of Justice to review the legality of measures adopted by the institutions. Natural and legal persons are thus protected against the application to them of general measures which they cannot contest directly before the Court by reason of the special conditions of admissibility laid down in the second paragraph of Article 173 of the Treaty. (...)

With the ruling, the system by which the European political parties were financed with economic resources directly from the budgets of the individual parliamentary groups, which were funded through resources from the general budget of the European Communities, was declared unlawful. This system gave undue advantages to political entities belonging to an elective institution: for the Court, public resources should be allocated without distinction between parties present in Parliament and those willing to enter it for the first time.

== See also ==
- European Union law
