= Greens Creek (Meramec River tributary) =

Stream in the U.S. state of Missouri

Greens Creek is a stream in Crawford and Washington counties in the U.S. state of Missouri. It is a tributary of the Meramec River.

The stream headwaters are at 38°06′13″N 91°03′27″W and the confluence with the Meramec is at 38°09′08″N 91°06′36″W.

Greens Creek, formerly called Green's Branch, was named after Davey Green, a pioneer prospector.
