= Madretsch =

Coordinates: 47°07′56″N 7°15′16″E

Madretsch (formerly Mardrez) is a former commune in the Swiss canton of Bern. It is a suburb of Biel/Bienne, which it joined in 1920.

Previously a rural suburb with some remaining farms and green areas, it has now become fully integrated as a city suburb, without any real local character any more.

Local schools are taught in both German and French.

== See also ==
- http://commons.wikimedia.org/wiki/File:Karte_Biel_Quartiere_Madretsch_Süd.png
