= The Flatirons =

Rock formations near Boulder, Colorado, US

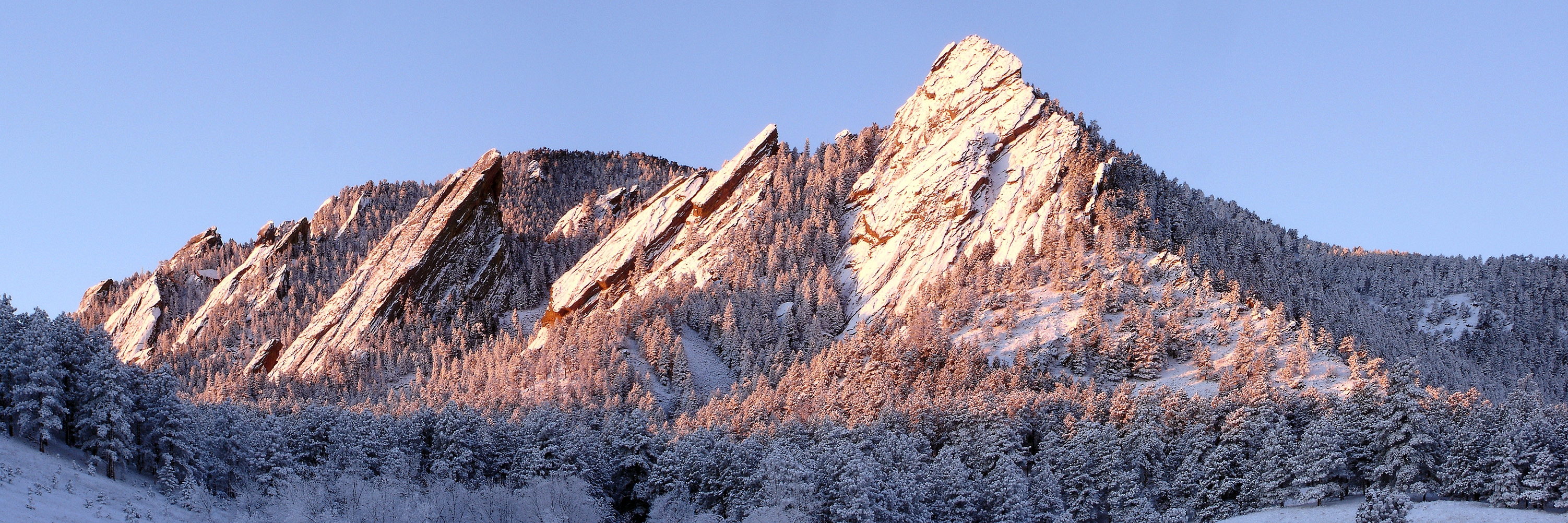
- View of the first through fifth Flatirons from Chautauqua Park

Highest point
- Coordinates: 40°00′N 105°18′W

Geography
- Location: Boulder, CO

The Flatirons are rock formations in the western United States, near Boulder, Colorado, consisting of flatirons. There are five large, numbered Flatirons ranging from north to south (First through Fifth, respectively) along the east slope of Green Mountain (elev. 8,148 ft or 2,484 m), and the term "The Flatirons" sometimes refers to these five alone. Numerous additional named Flatirons are on the southern part of Green Mountain, Bear Peak, and among the surrounding foothills. The rocks themselves are between 290-296 million years old. They are a popular rock-climbing location, with Mountain Project listing 1,427 climbing routes in The Flatirons. Many gather at Chautauqua Park in Boulder at the base of The Flatirons to enjoy the natural environment, preserved by Boulder Parks and Recreation. The Flatirons are an iconic symbol of Boulder, serving as the city's signature backdrop, emphasizing the culture of adventure.

== Etymology ==
The Flatirons were known as the "Chautauqua Slabs" c. 1900 and "The Crags" c. 1906. The origin of the current name is from settlers noticing the resemblance they have to old-fashioned clothes irons. Over time they became commonly known as "Flatirons", or "The Flatirons".

== Geology ==
The Flatirons consist of conglomeratic sandstone of the Fountain Formation. Geologists estimate the age of these rocks as 290 to 296 million years; they were lifted and tilted into their present orientation between 80 and 35 million years ago, during the Laramide Orogeny. The Flatirons were subsequently exposed by erosion. Other manifestations of the Fountain Formation can be found in many places along the Colorado Front Range, including Garden of the Gods near Colorado Springs, Roxborough State Park in Douglas County, and Red Rocks Amphitheatre near Morrison.

== Climbing ==
The Flatirons on Green Mountain and Bear Peak are part of the City of Boulder’s Open Space and Mountain Parks system. They are popular destinations for hikers and rock climbers, offering routes ranging from easier climbs (5.0) to world-class rock grades (5.14b). Among the area’s notable routes is the East Face Standard on the Third Flatiron. Guidebook author and longtime climber Richard Rossiter describes it as “the best 5.4 in the solar system.” Other well-known routes include the Direct East Face (5.6) on the First Flatiron, a climb of more than 1,000 feet that presents a significant challenge even for experienced climbers. The Standard East Face (5.3) on the Third Flatiron is widely regarded as an accessible introduction to multi-pitch climbing in Colorado. The North Face (5.6) offers a more exposed and scenic climbing experience, with views overlooking Boulder, but requires greater comfort with heights and confidence in route-finding.

During the 1980s, tensions arose between rock climbers and the Flatirons land management over fixed-anchor use, leading to a ban on bolting along with halting new route development in the Flatirons. In 1997, members of the Flatirons climbing community began working to rebuild relations with the City of Boulder's Open Space and Mountain Parks department, arguing that climbers not only climb the Flatirons but also contribute to conservation and outdoor education. As a result of improved relations and formal permitting processes, several formations are now open to new route development and fixed-anchor use.

Controversy has risen about the safety precautions being taken, as in recent years there have been multiple deaths related to scrambling on the Flatirons. Although mistakes are bound to happen, the overall safety measures already put in place are under question.

== Wildlife and conservation ==
At the base of the Rocky Mountains, the slab rock formation called "The Flatirons" has attracts many tourists and residents year-round. This illusion overlooks the city of Boulder. Tourists and hikers witness wild mammals such as the elk, coyote, red fox, marmot, porcupine, weasel, and et cetera. As many varieties of birds live on these rocks, the birds witnessed are peregrine falcons, prairie falcons, and golden eagles.

Along with the flora and fauna of this ecosystem, some wildlife, such as bears, mountain lions, and coyotes, are also inhabitants of the region.

== A symbol of Boulder ==
Flatirons - Aerial view from E. Boulder

Images of the numbered Flatirons on Green Mountain are ubiquitous symbols of the city of Boulder. Due to the way these flatirons are lying, this can give the illusion of a flat iron tool, hence the name "Flatirons". These Flatirons also symbolize the wildlife and nature that the city of Boulder is known for. The area abounds with photographs, drawings, paintings, and sculptures. The city government, the University of Colorado, and many businesses make use of this symbol in their logos, advertisements, and marketing materials. Many businesses also use the word "Flatirons "or "The Flatiron" in their names. In addition, Boulder often is referred to in the tech industry as the "Silicon Flatirons", analogous to Santa Clara Valley's famous nickname.

The third Flatiron bore a "CU," for the University of Colorado, in 50-foot (15 m) white letters from the 1950s until 1980, when the city painted over the initials to restore the natural look of the stone formation. CU students Dale Johnson and Robert Rowlands climbed the Flatiron one night in November 1949 to paint the original "C." The "C" was removed and painted again, with a "U" being added in the 1950s. The city of Boulder painted over these letters because many of the citizens felt like it took away the slab's natural beauty. The letters are still faintly visible under the reddish paint used by the city in 1980.

== Gallery ==
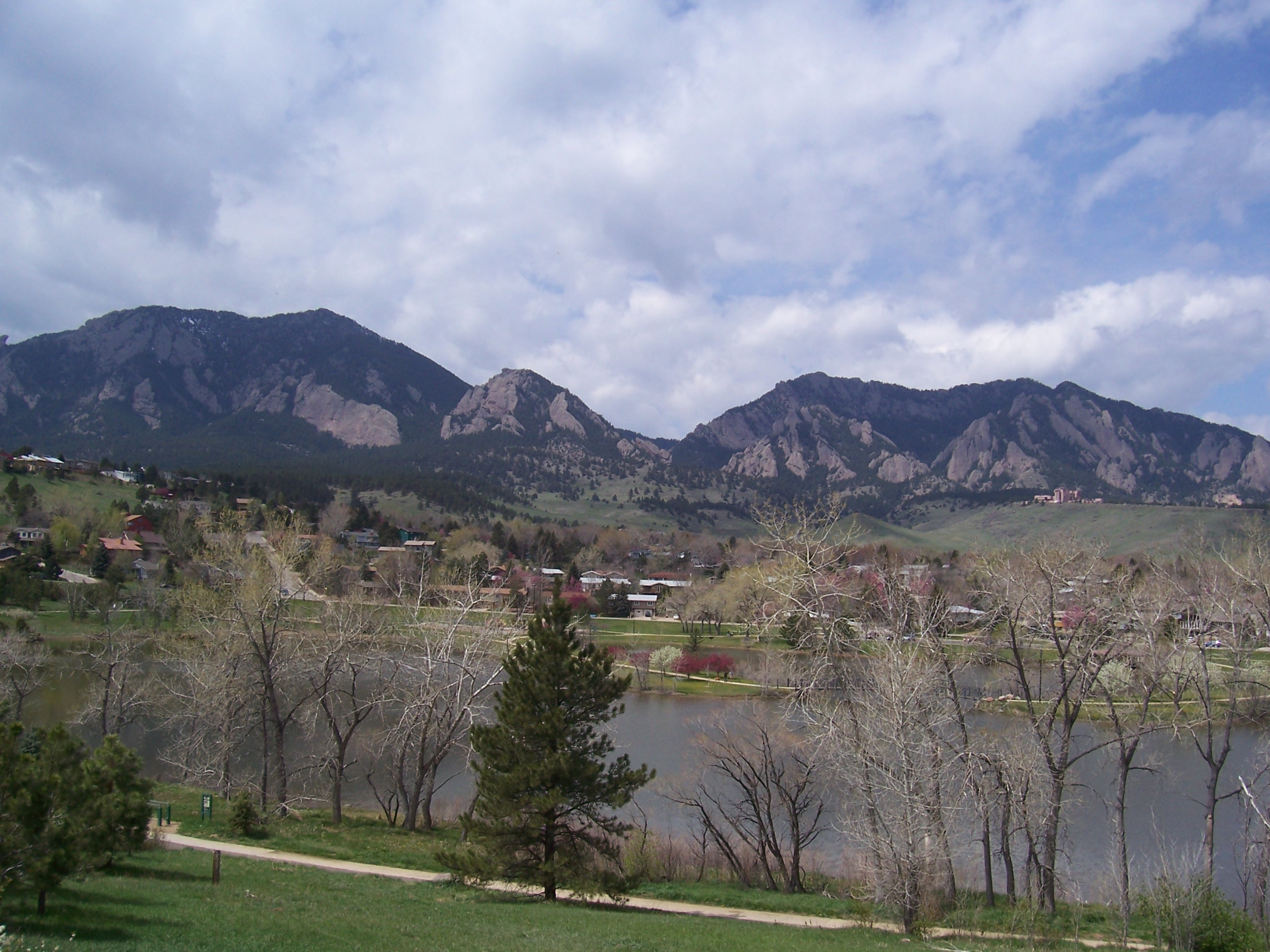
View of The Flatirons from Fairview High School in southern Boulder

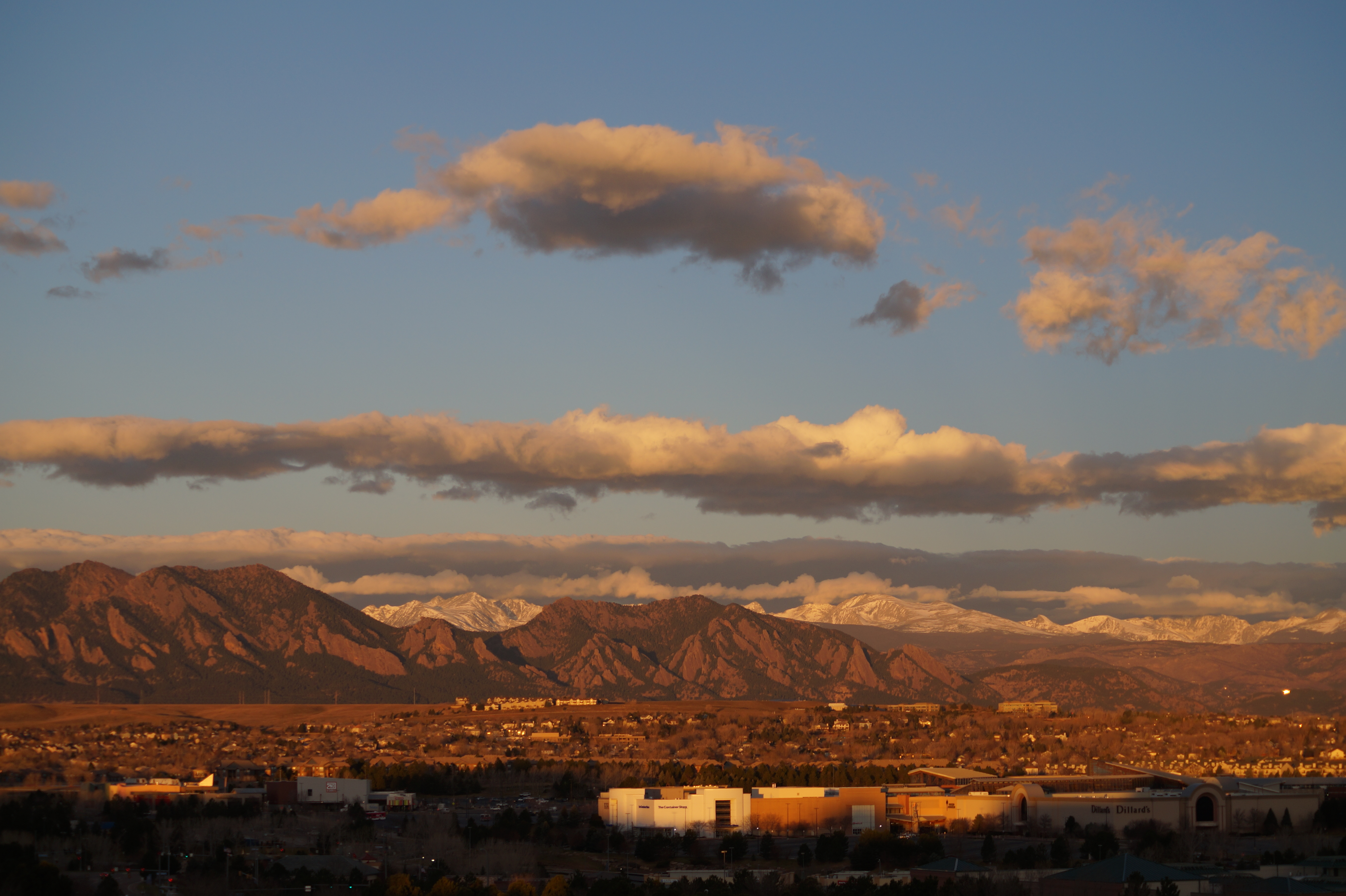
Morning view of The Flatirons from Broomfield, Colorado

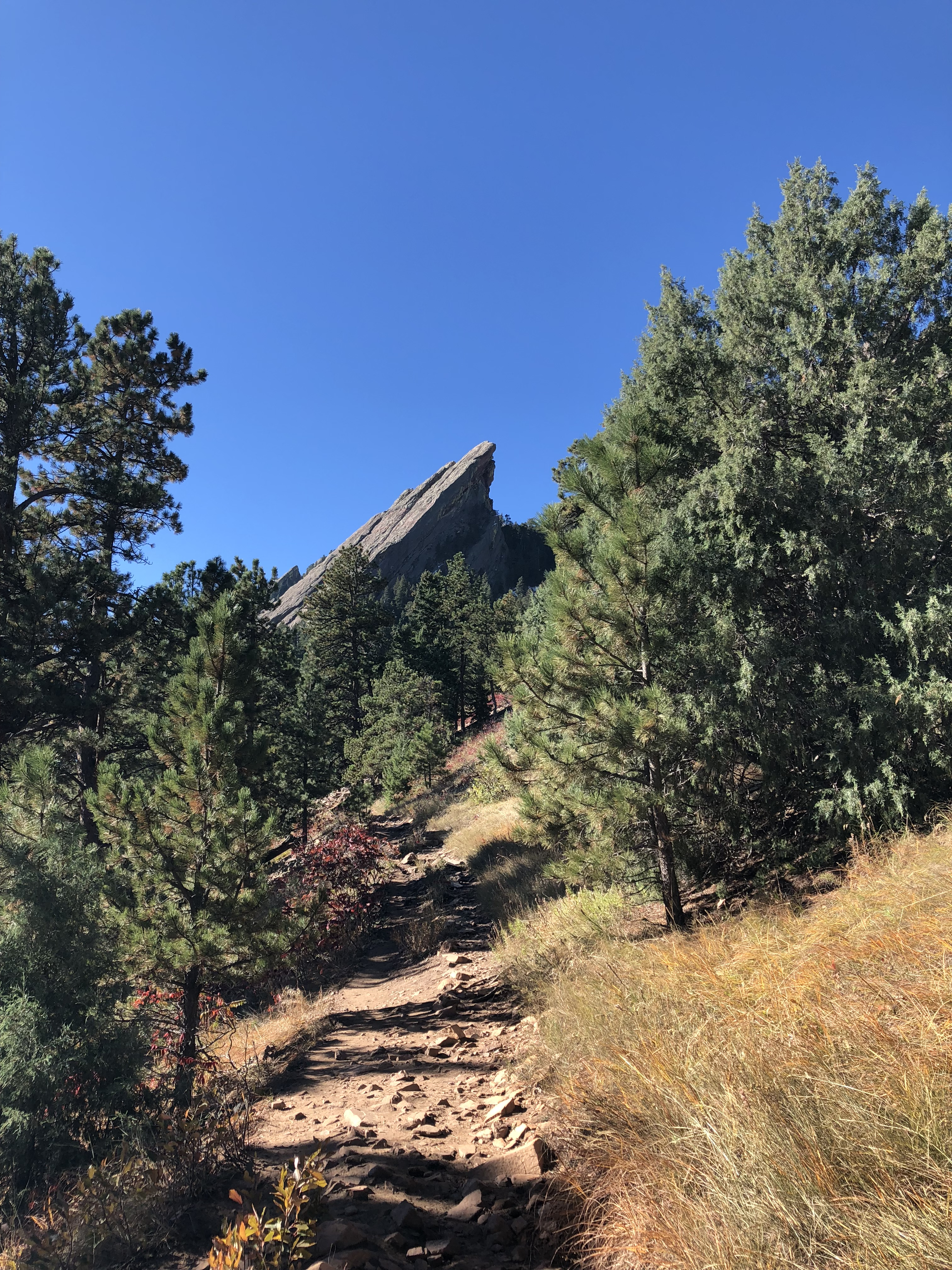
Third Flatiron, Boulder

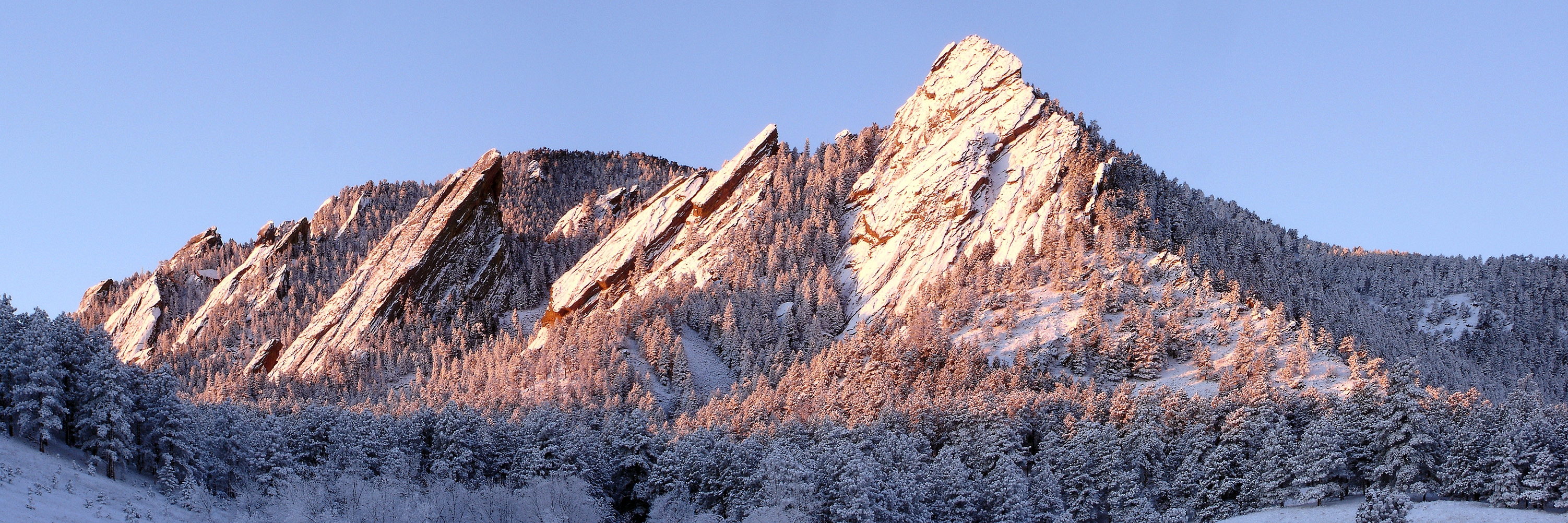
View of The Flatirons during sunrise in the winter

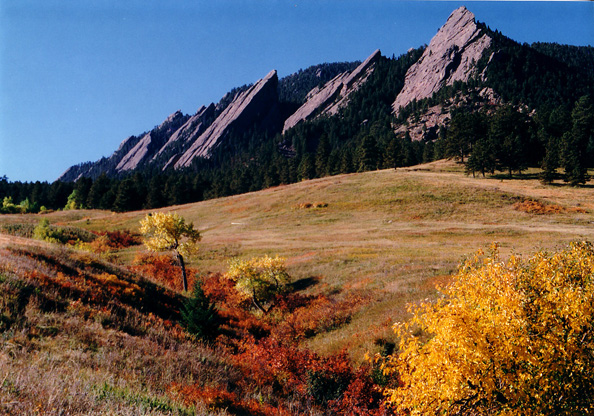
View of The Flatirons in the fall

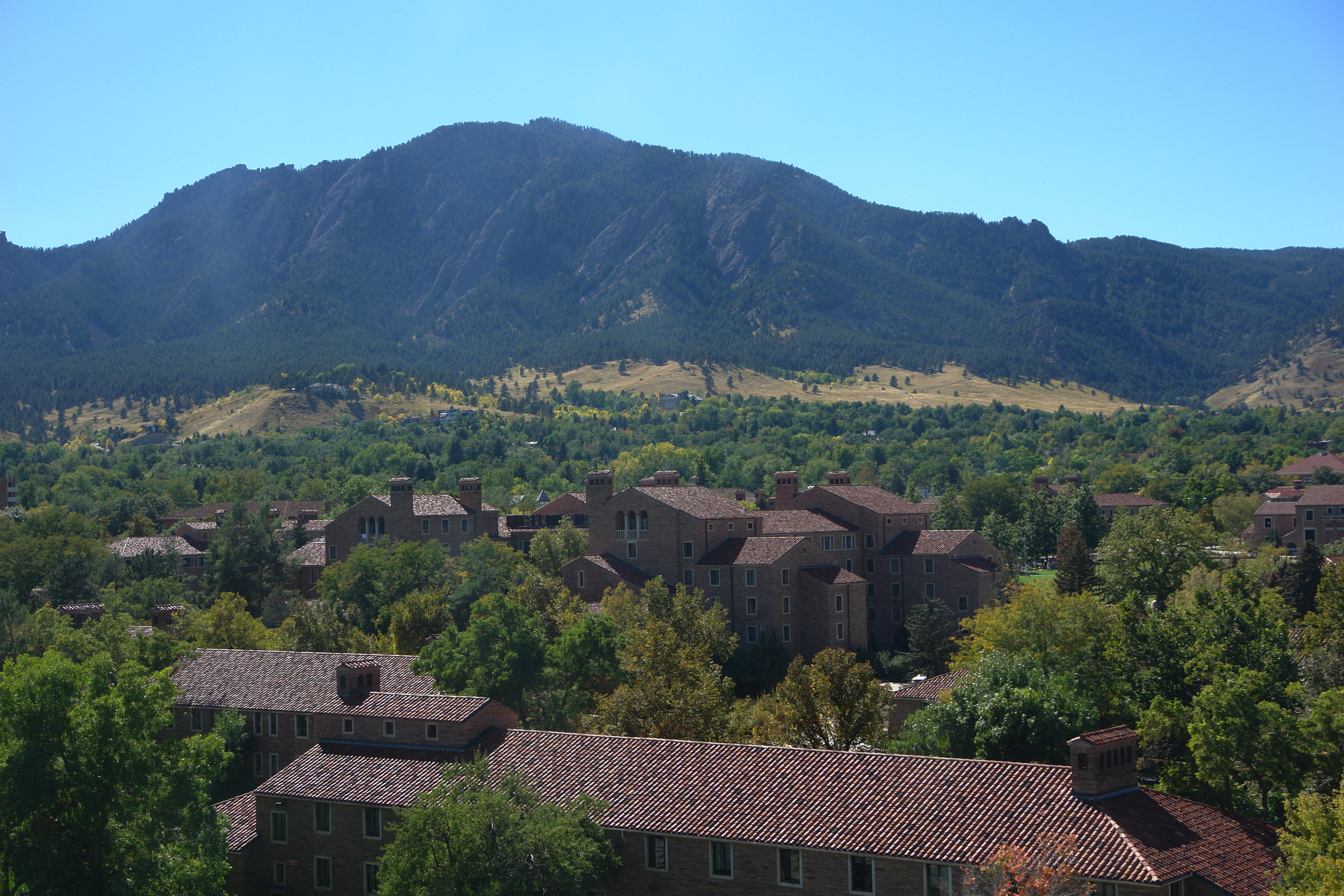
View of University of Colorado Boulder with The Flatirons as the backdrop

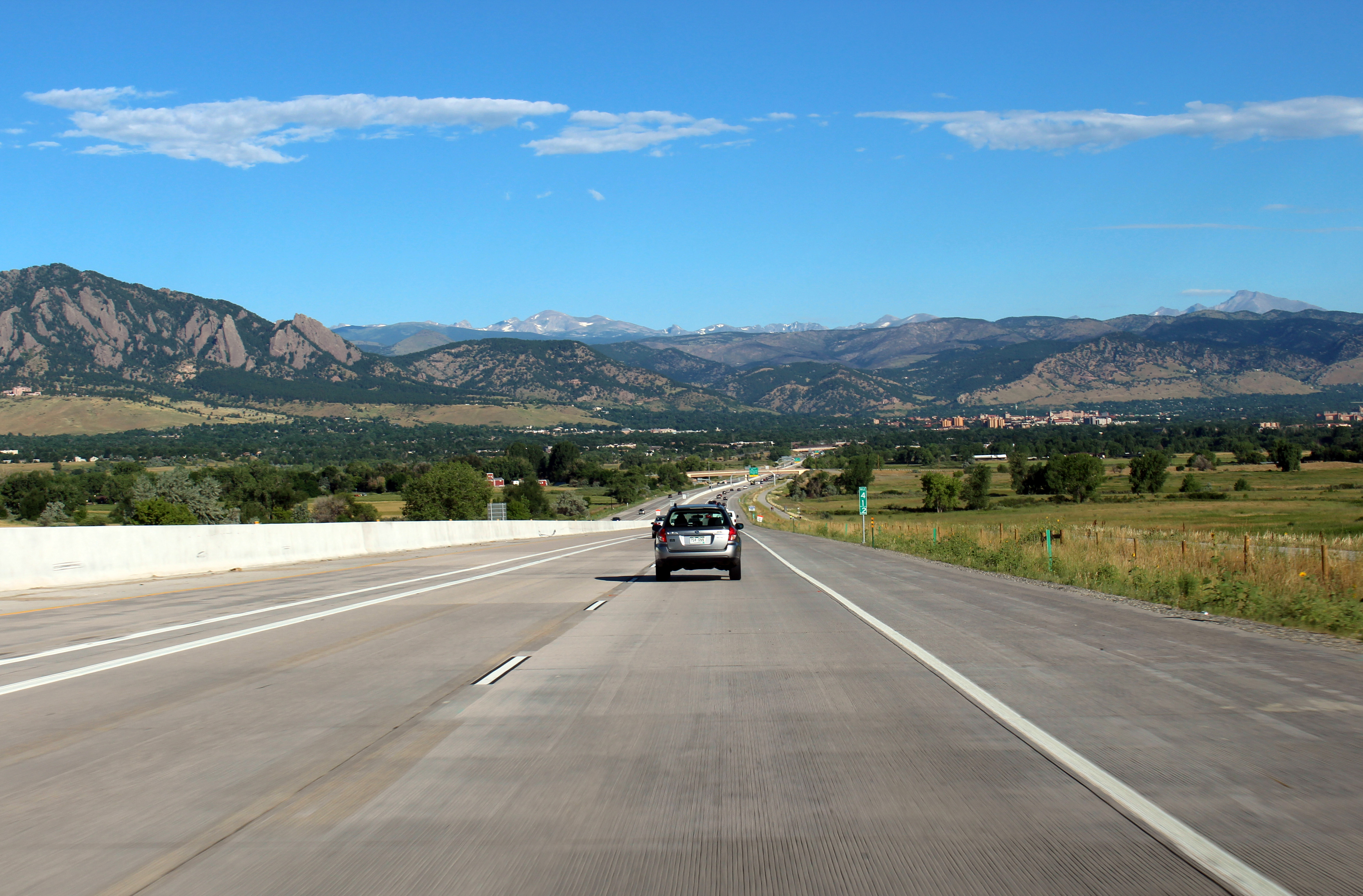
The Flatirons from afar while driving in Boulder, Colorado
