= Monteverde Theme Park =

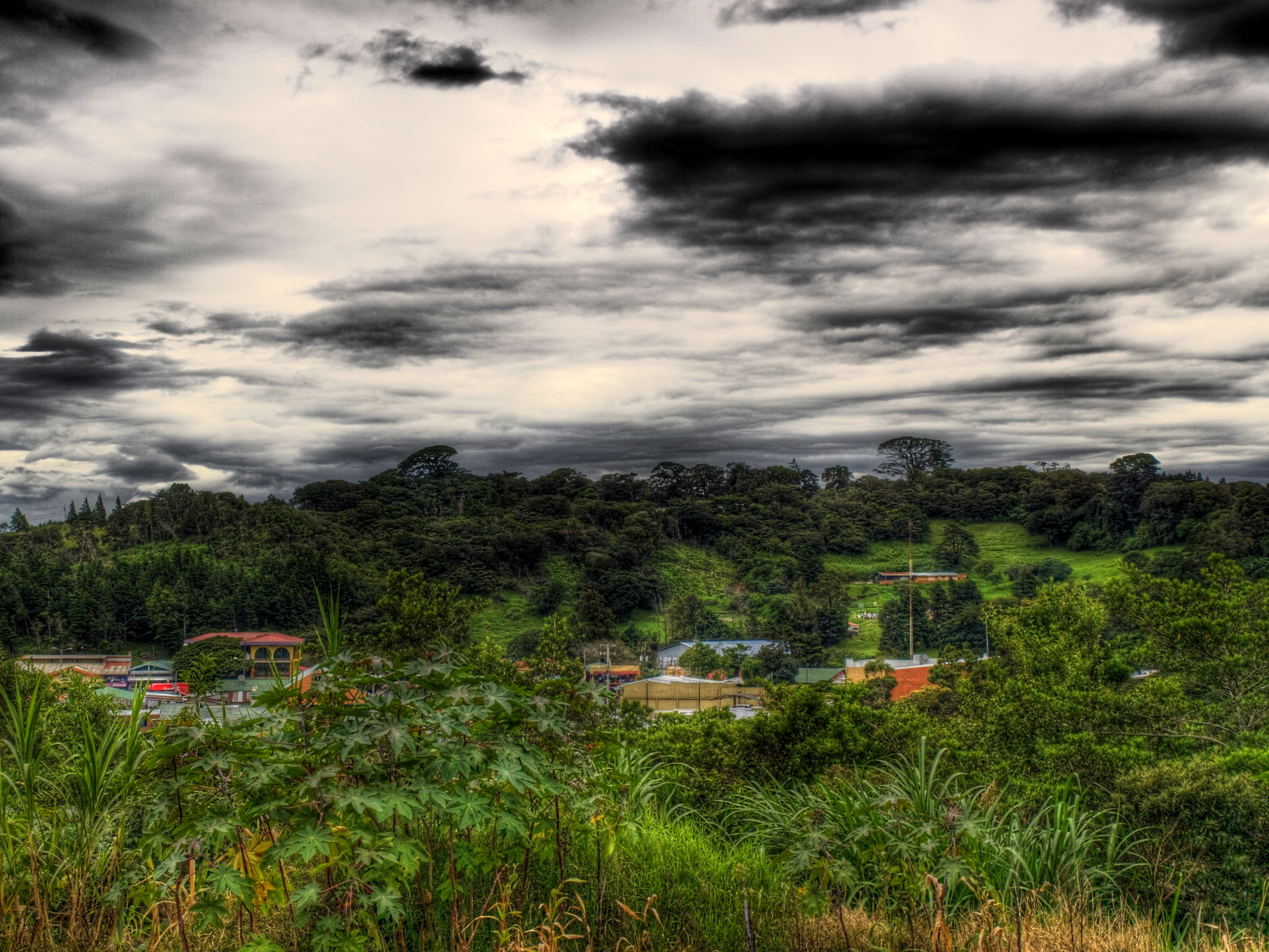
- View of the Theme Park neighborhood
- Interactive map of Monteverde Theme Park
- 10°18′55″N 84°49′28″W
- Location: Puntarenas Province, Costa Rica
- No. of species: 50–60
- Major exhibits: frog pond, insects, bird watching

The Monteverde Theme Park, previously known as Frog Pond Ranarium (Spanish: Ranario de Monteverde), located in Santa Elena, north of Monteverde, Puntarenas Province, Costa Rica, is a frog pond turned animal theme park that houses a butterfly farm with approximately 30 live butterfly species and other insects and over 25 species of frogs and other amphibians from around the country in a climate controlled habitat.

The park includes flowering plants, cascading waterfalls and trees. There are also several species of free flying "butterfly friendly" birds. There is a learning center where visitors get a close up view of a variety of live caterpillars feeding and developing on their host plants. It also hosts a newly installed 8-cable zip-line through the park's tropical forest, the only zip-line in Costa Rica open at night.

== Exhibits ==
=== Frog pond ===
The frog pond is an indoor exhibit and guided tour of about 28 species. The exhibit is available to visit at night. The snake pond also features select snake displays.

=== Butterfly farm ===
The butterfly farm houses approximately 30 species native to Monteverde and surrounding areas of the cloud forest of the Canton. Some worldwide butterflies are in preserved displays.

== See also ==
- List of zoos by country: Costa Rica zoos
