= Dietrich Gruen =

German American watchmaker (1847–1911)

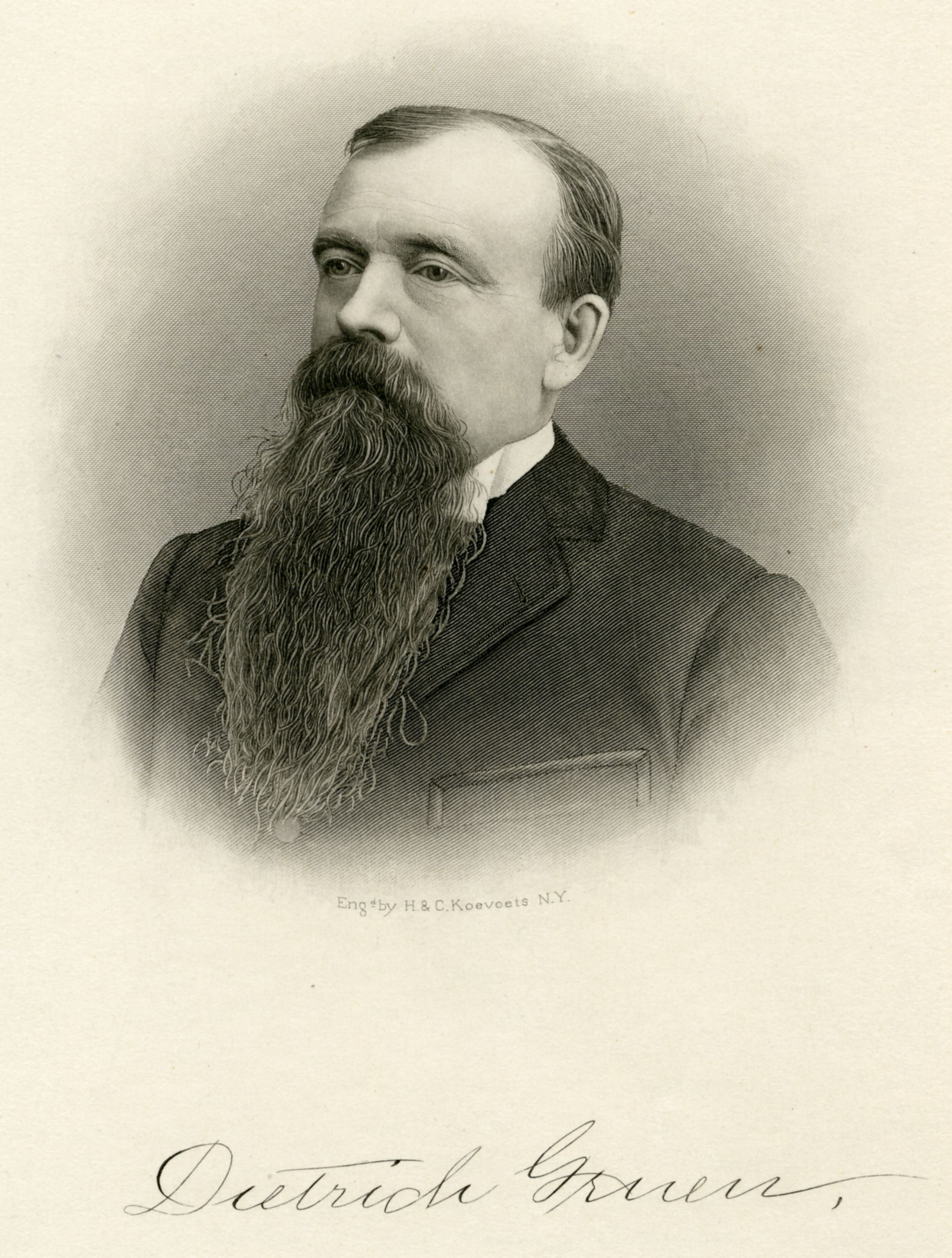
- Born: February 22, 1847; Osthofen, Grand Duchy of Hesse, Germany
- Died: April 10, 1911 (aged 64 years); Italy
- Occupation: watchmaker

Dietrich Gruen (February 22, 1847 – April 10, 1911), was a German born watchmaker who emigrated to the United States in the 1860s and later founded the Gruen Watch Company.

== Early life and education ==
Gruen attended public and private schools in Germany. At age 15 he began learning the watchmaking trade. He apprenticed to Hans Martens in Freiburg, Germany and worked in Karlsruhe, Wiesbaden and Lode.

== Later life and career ==
In 1867, at age 20, he immigrated to the United States, following in the steps of his three older brothers, all of whom had immigrated several years before. (One brother had died in 1863 in the American Civil War.)

On his trip to America he met Pauline Wittlinger, the daughter of a watchmaker who lived in Delaware, Ohio. In 1869 Gruen married Wittlinger and moved to Ohio to work for her father. Dietrich's and Pauline's first child, Frederick G. Gruen, was born in 1872; George J. Gruen was born in 1877.

In 1874 Gruen filed U.S. patent 157,913 for a 'safety' pinion that prevented damage to a pocket-watch movement if the mainspring broke. In 1876 he started the Columbus Watch Manufacturing Company in Columbus, Ohio. In 1882 the company was reorganized as the Columbus Watch Company and moved to a building on Thurman Street. The company now saw itself as in the same ranks of older established American watch companies like Waltham Watch Company and Elgin National Watch Company.

In 1894 Gruen left the Columbus Watch Company, which later bankrupted following the Panic of 1893. That same year Dietrich and his son Frederick founded a new watchmaking company, D. Gruen & Son—later changed to D. Gruen & Sons when son George joined the firm. By 1898 Gruen and sons had established the Gruen Watch Company in Cincinnati, Ohio.

In 1911 Gruen died suddenly on the steamship SS Berlin on a business trip to Italy with his son Fred, near Algiers.
