= Grüns =

American nutritional supplement company

- Type: Private
- Industry: Dietary supplements
- Founded: 2023; 3 years ago
- Founder: Chad Janis
- Headquarters: U.S.
- Key people: Chad Janis (CEO)
- Products: Superfoods Greens Gummies
- Parent: Unilever
- Website: gruns.co

Grüns is an American nutritional supplement company founded in 2023 by Chad Janis. The company sells Superfoods Greens Gummies through its website, Amazon, and retailers including Sprouts Farmers Market, Target, and Walmart. Its name comes from the German word for "greens". Since June 2026, Grüns has been a subsidiary of Unilever.

== History ==
Grüns was founded in 2023 by Chad Janis to produce dietary supplements in gummy form, positioned as an alternative to powdered greens products that had been gaining popularity in the U.S. supplement market.

Grüns sold its first product through its website in August 2023, after Janis raised about $400,000 from classmates, friends, and family, which was rolled into a $1.8 million pre-seed round closed the same month. The product launched on Amazon in December 2023, and the company closed a $6 million seed round in February 2024.

Grüns entered physical retail in December 2024 with Sprouts Farmers Market, followed by Target and Walmart in April 2025, and Costco in 2026. By mid-2025, the products were sold in nearly 5,000 retail locations in the United States, and by April 2026, following an expansion into Kroger, in more than 7,000 retail locations. In 2025, the company opened a production and distribution facility in Dallas.

In May 2025, Grüns raised a $35 million Series B round led by Headline, valuing the company at around $500 million. In total, the company raised about $54.8 million. That year, Inc. included Grüns in a list of food-technology companies to watch, and in 2026 Fast Company named it one of its "Most Innovative Companies" in wellness and personal care.

On April 9, 2026, Unilever announced that it had signed an agreement to acquire Grüns. The financial terms were not disclosed. Axios reported the deal at about $1.2 billion. The acquisition was completed on June 1, 2026, with Grüns becoming part of Unilever's Wellbeing business and continuing to operate as a standalone company under Janis.

== Products ==
Grüns' main product, the Superfoods Greens Gummies, is a daily superfood greens gummy that is packaged in single-serve packets. According to the company, each daily serving contains more than 60 ingredients, including whole-food fruits and vegetables, vitamins and minerals, and prebiotic fiber. The company states that the gummies are vegan and gluten-free and use a pectin base rather than gelatin, and that the adult product is offered in low-sugar and sugar-free versions, the latter sweetened with allulose and Reb M. Trade publications have compared Grüns to other supplement brands such as AG1 and Bloom Nutrition. The line has since expanded to include Grüns Kids, a children's formulation introduced in July 2024, and additional products including Nütrops, Immün, and Jüced. In April 2026, Grüns released a limited-edition Strawberry Vanilla Superfoods Greens Gummies flavor in collaboration with the soft drink brand Olipop.
