= GRIN Campaign =

LGBTQ advocacy group

Global Respect In Education
- Founded: 2010
- Founder: Claudia White
- Type: Educational Charity
- Purpose: Education, LGBTQ, respect, bullying and homophobia
- Location: UK
- Region served: Global with focus on the US and UK
- Method: Popular education and social media awareness campaigns
- Website: www.grincampaign.com

GRIN Campaign, Global Respect in Education, is a transatlantic non-profit organisation and advocacy group which campaigns primarily for lesbian, gay, bisexual, transgender, and queer/questioning (LGBTQ) people's social and political equality in education. It seeks to end discrimination, harassment, and bullying based on sexual orientation, gender identity and gender expression in all educational institutes with an underlying message that "being different was 'cool'". It is one of the first campaigns of its kind to originate outside the United States, be run by students and intentionally international.

The campaign supports both direct action and a viral photographic protest, known as “RESPECT” to help "make respecting people in school a cool idea" and ignorance to be “uncool”. The photographs show people in front of a white backdrop wearing block rainbow colors with “RESPECT” painted on their face in the colors of the pride flag. The campaign was created on October 29, 2010, by Bedales School student Claudia White. The RESPECT photographs are featured on the campaign's website, as well as Facebook and Flickr. The campaign also had over 1000 followers on Twitter within a week of its website going live.

== History ==
GRIN Campaign was initiated in response to a rash of widely publicized bullying-related suicides of juvenile, particularly, LGBTQ youth, including that of Tyler Clementi. It was established as a UK and US alternative to other, older LGBT civil rights advocacy organizations, which did not place as much emphasis on education, and focused only on the United States. The campaign hopes to build awareness in the same spirit as the Day of Silence, It Gets Better Project, No on 8 campaigns and efforts to repeal Don't Ask Don't Tell.

The campaign coordinated with Spirit Day (October 20) when people are encouraged to wear purple symbolic of spirit from the rainbow flag.

In 2011 the campaign worked to add "amendments to the UK’s Educational White Paper, started developing anti-bullying and LGBT rights lesson plans, and wrote letters to corporations in the UK that they believed were being homophobic or transphobic." In the summer of 2012 the campaign received a grant to travel to San Francisco in the United States to teach their lesson plans about discrimination based bullying and utilize the RESPECT photographic campaign.

In 2013 the campaign started a petition to add the word 'transphobia' to the Oxford English Dictionary and the dictionary lexicon of Microsoft Office. The petition was hosted on the website Change.org and gained nearly 10,000 signatures. By June, both Microsoft and the Oxford English Dictionary had added the word 'transphobia' to their dictionary lexicons.

== See also ==
- LGBT rights in the United States
- LGBT rights in the United Kingdom
