= Green River =

Green River may refer to:

== Rivers ==
=== Canada ===
- Green River (British Columbia), a tributary of the Lillooet River
- Green River, a tributary of the Saint John River, also known by its French name of Rivière Verte
- Green River (Ontario), a tributary of the Crowe River

=== United States ===
- Green River (Illinois), a tributary of the Rock River
- Green River (Kentucky), a tributary of the Ohio River
- Green River (Housatonic River tributary), a tributary of the Housatonic River in Massachusetts and New York
- Green River (Hoosic River tributary), a tributary of the Hoosic River in Massachusetts
- Green River (Deerfield River tributary), a tributary of the Deerfield River in Massachusetts and Vermont
- Green River (Cold River tributary), a river of Massachusetts
- Green River, a tributary of the Jordan River in Antrim County, Michigan
- Green River, part of the Elk River Chain of Lakes Watershed in Antrim County, Michigan
- Green River (North Carolina)
- Green River (North Dakota), a tributary of the Heart River
- Green River (Oregon), a tributary of Five Rivers
- Green River (Missouri), a river of Missouri
- Green River (Tennessee), a tributary of the Buffalo River
- Green River (Texas), a tributary of the Rio Grande
- Green River (Batten Kill), a river of Vermont
- Green River (Lamoille River tributary), a river of Vermont
- Green River (Colorado River tributary), major tributary of the Colorado River, headwaters in Wyoming, flowing into Utah with a loop into Colorado
- Green River (Duwamish River tributary), a tributary of the Duwamish River in the U.S. state of Washington
- Green River (North Fork Toutle River tributary), the largest tributary of the North Fork Toutle River in the U.S. state of Washington
- Green River (Toutle River tributary), a river of Washington

=== Elsewhere ===
- Green River (Northern Cape), a river in the Northern Cape Province, South Africa
- Yeşilırmak (river), a river of northern Turkey

== Places ==
- Green River, Illinois, an unincorporated community in Henry County
- Green River, Michigan, an unincorporated community
- Green River, Utah, a city in Emery County
  - Green River station (Utah), an Amtrak train station
- Green River, Wyoming, a city in Sweetwater County
  - Green River station (Wyoming), a former Amtrak train station
- Green River, a ghost town in British Columbia
- Green River, a community in Pickering, Ontario
- Rivière-Verte, New Brunswick, a village in Madawaska County
- Green River Rural LLG, local-level government in Sandaun Province, Papua New Guinea

== Music ==
- Green River (band), a grunge band from Seattle, Washington
- Green River (album), a 1969 album by Creedence Clearwater Revival
  - "Green River" (song), a 1969 song from that album
- "Green River", a song by C. W. McCall on the album Black Bear Road
- "Green River", a song by Waylon Jennings from the album Nashville Rebel
- "Green River", a song by The Everly Brothers from the album Stories We Could Tell
- "Green River", a song from the Dixie Chick's debut album Thank Heavens for Dale Evans
- "Green River", a song by Hooded Fang from the 2010 album titled Album
- "Green River", a song by Real Estate from the album Real Estate
- "Green River", an instrumental by Church of Misery from the album Master of Brutality

== Other uses ==
- Green River (soft drink), a bright green, lime-flavored soft drink which originated in Chicago. It was created by the Schoenhofen Edelweiss Brewing Company in 1919, and is currently manufactured by WIT Beverage Company
- Novell "Green River", codename for Novell NetWare 4.11
- Green River Community College, community college in Auburn, Washington
- Green River Formation, a geologic formation in the States of Colorado, Wyoming, and Utah in the United States of America
- Green River Killer or Gary Ridgway, an American serial killer
- Green River Launch Complex, a missile testing ground outside Green River, Utah, operated by the U. S. Air Force from 1964 to 1973
- Green River ordinance, a common United States city ordinance prohibiting door-to-door solicitation

== See also ==
- Green Creek (disambiguation)
