= The Greens (Benin) =

Political party in Benin

The Greens Les Verts
- Founded: 1990s
- Ideology: Green politics
- International affiliation: Global Greens

The Greens (French: Les Verts) is a political party in Benin. It was part of the Star Alliance which contested the 1999 and 2003 parliamentary elections. At the Beninese parliamentary election in 2003, the Star Alliance won three out of 83 seats.

In 2011, the Greens were said to have had 500 members. However, the party had no elected members in the National Assembly or in the 77 local councils in the country.

== See also ==
- Conservation movement
- Environmental movement
- Green party
- List of environmental organizations
