= Charles Cooper =

Charles Cooper may refer to:

== Arts and media ==
- Charles Alfred Cooper (1829–1916), British newspaper editor and author
- Charles Henry St. John Cooper (1869–1926), English author
- Charles Cooper (actor) (1926–2013), television and movie actor
- Charlie Cooper (actor) (born 1989), British actor

== Law and politics ==
- Charles D. Cooper (1769–1831), New York secretary of state, 1817–1818
- Charles Purton Cooper (1793–1873), English lawyer and antiquary
- Charles Cooper (judge) (1795–1887), first chief justice of South Australia, 1856–1861
- Charles F. Cooper (politician) (1852–1919), English-born Free Baptist clergyman and political figure in Nova Scotia, Canada
- Charles Merian Cooper (1856–1923), U.S. representative from Florida
- Charles H. Cooper (1865–1946), justice of the Montana Supreme Court
- Charles J. Cooper (born 1952), American appellate attorney and litigator in Washington, D.C.

== Sport ==
- Charles Cooper (cricketer) (1868–1943), English cricketer
- Charlie Cooper (footballer) (born 1997), English professional footballer
- Charles Cooper (basketball) (1907–1980), basketball player for New York Renaissance
- Chuck Cooper (basketball) (1926–1984), basketball player for the Boston Celtics

== Other ==
- Charles Henry Cooper (1808–1866), English antiquarian
- Charles Cooper (motor manufacturer) (1893–1964), co-founder of the Cooper Car Company
- Charles F. Cooper (ecologist) (1924–1994), American ecologist
- Brad Cooper (admiral) (Charles Bradford Cooper II, born 1967), American admiral

== See also ==
- Chuck Cooper (disambiguation)
