= Philosophy of ecology =

Branch of philosophy

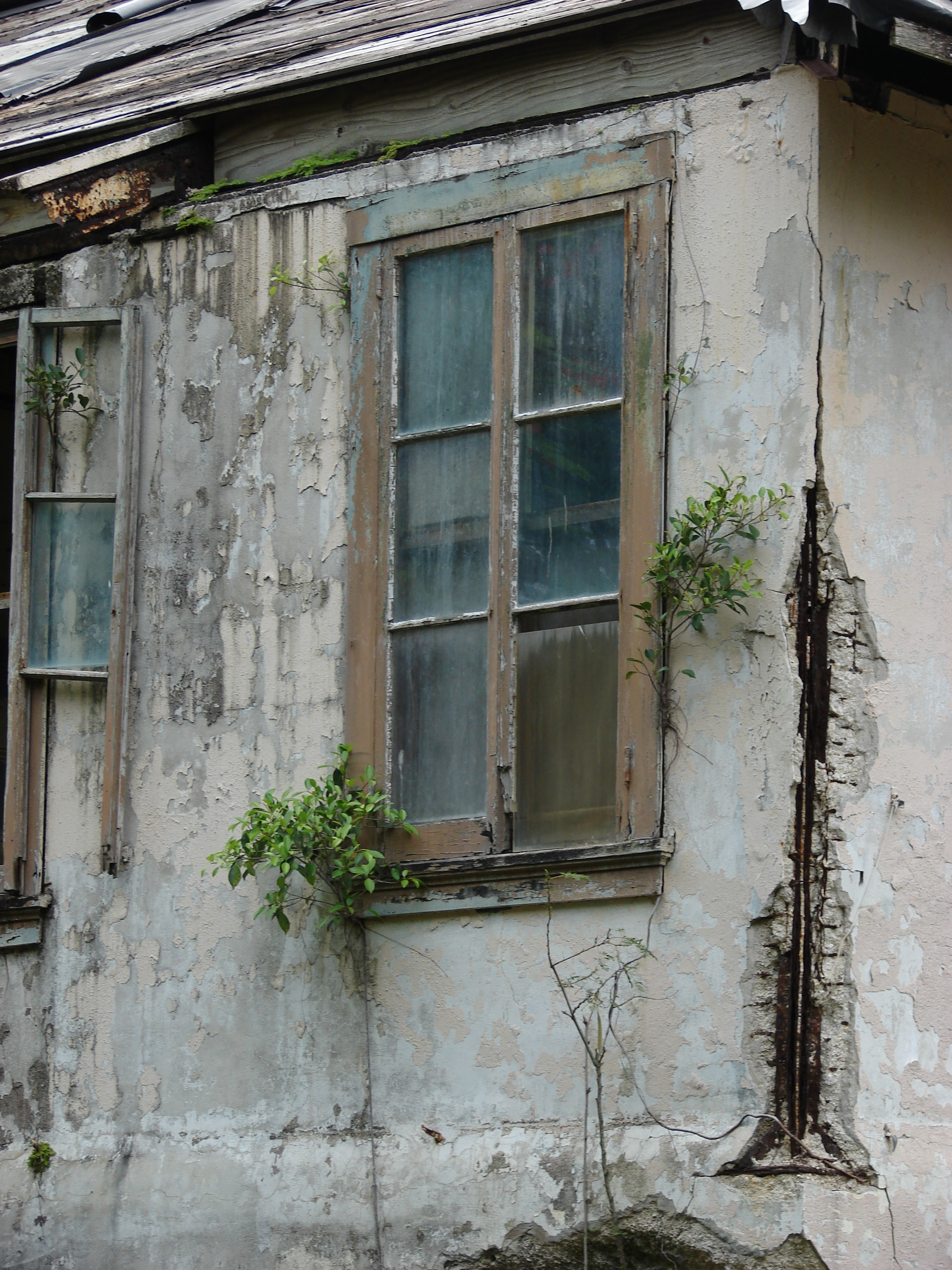
Plant growth on the exterior of a dilapidated wall.

Philosophy of ecology is a concept under the philosophy of science, which is a subfield of philosophy. Its main concerns centre on the practice and application of ecology, its moral issues, and the intersectionality between the position of humans and other entities. This topic also overlaps with metaphysics, ontology, and epistemology, for example, as it attempts to answer metaphysical, epistemic and moral issues surrounding environmental ethics and public policy.

The aim of the philosophy of ecology is to clarify and critique the 'first principles’, which are the fundamental assumptions present in science and the natural sciences. Although there has yet to be a consensus about what presupposes philosophy of ecology, and the definition for ecology is up for debate, there are some central issues that philosophers of ecology consider when examining the role and purpose of what ecologists practice. For example, this field considers the 'nature of nature', the methodological and conceptual issues surrounding ecological research, and the problems associated with these studies within its contextual environment.

Philosophy addresses the questions that make up ecological studies, and presents a different perspective into the history of ecology, environmental ethics in ecological science, and the application of mathematical models.

== Background ==
=== History ===
Ecology is considered as a relatively new scientific discipline, having been acknowledged as a formal scientific field in the late nineteenth and early twentieth century. Although an established definition of ecology has yet to be presented, there are some commonalities in the questions proposed by ecologists.

Ecology was considered as “the science of the economy [and] habits,” according to Stauffer, and was proponent in understanding the external interrelations between organisms. It was recognised formally as a field of science in 1866 by German zoologist Ernst Haeckel (1834-1919). Haeckel termed ‘ecology’ in his book, Generelle Morphologie der Organismen (1866), in the attempt to present a synthesis of morphology, taxonomy, and the evolution of animals.

Haeckel aimed to refine the notion of ecology and propose a new area of study to investigate population growth and stability, as influenced by Charles Darwin and his work in Origin of Species (1859). He had first expressed ecology as an interchangeable term constituted within an area of biology and an aspect of ‘physiology of relationships’. In the English translation by Stauffer, Haeckel defined ecology as “the whole science of the relationship of organism to environment including, in the broad sense, all the ‘conditions for existence.'” This neologism was used to distinguish studies conducted on the field, as opposed to those conducted within the laboratory. He expanded upon this definition of ecology after considering the Darwinian theory of evolution and natural selection.

=== Defining ecology ===
There is yet to be an established consensus amongst philosophers about the exact definition of ecology, however, there are commonalities in the research agendas that helps differentiate this discipline from other natural sciences.

Ecology underlies an ecological worldview, wherein interaction and connectedness are emphasized and developed through several themes:

1. The idea that living and non-living beings are related and interconnected components in the biospherical web.
2. Living entities possess an identity that expresses their relatedness.
3. It is essential to understand the system of the biosphere and the components as a whole, rather than as their parts (also known as holism).
4. Occurrence of naturalism, whereby all living organisms are governed by the same natural laws.
5. Non-anthropocentrism, which is the rejection of anthropocentrism and its views on humans being the central entity, governed by the belief that value in the non-human world is to serve human interest. Non-anthropocentrism dictates that non-human world retains value and does not serve to benefit human interest.
6. Anthropogenic degradation of the environment dictates a necessity for environmental ethics.

There are three main disciplinary categories of ecology: Romantic ecology, political ecology, and scientific ecology. Romantic ecology, also called aesthetic or literary ecology, was a counter-movement to the increasingly anthropocentric and mechanistic ideology presented in modern Europe and America of the nineteenth century, especially during the Industrial Revolution. Some notable figures of this period include William Wordsworth (1770-1862), John Muir (1838-1914), and Ralph Waldo Emerson (1803-1882). Scope of romantic ecological influence also extends into politics, and in which political interrelation with ethics underline political ecology.

Political ecology, also known as axiological or values-based ecology, considers the socio-political implications surrounding the ecological landscape. Some fundamental questions political ecologists ask generally focus on the ethics between nature and society. American environmentalist Aldo Leopold (1886-1948), affirm that ethics should be extended to encompass the land and biotic communities as well, rather than pertaining exclusively to individuals. In this sense, political ecology can be denoted as a form of environmental ethics.

Finally, scientific ecology, or commonly known as ecology, addresses central concerns, such as understanding the role of the ecologists and what they study, and the types of methodology and conceptual issues that surround the development of these studies and what type of problem this may present.

=== Contemporary ecology ===
Defining contemporary ecology requires looking at certain fundamental principles, namely principles of system and evolution. System entails understanding the processes, of which interconnected sections establish a holistic identity, not separated or predictable from their components. Evolution results from the ‘generation of variety’ as a means to produce change. Certain entities that interact with their environments create evolution through survival, and it is the production of changes that shape ecological systems. This evolutionary process is central to ecology and biology. There are three main concerns that ecologists generally concur with: naturalism, scientific realism, and the comprehensive scope of ecology.

Philosopher Frederick Ferre defines two different primary meanings for nature in Being and Value: Toward a Constructive Postmodern Metaphysics (1996). The first definition does not consider nature as 'artifacts of human manipulation’, and nature, in this sense, comprises those not of artificial origins. The second definition establishes nature as those not of supernatural conceptions, which includes artefacts of human manipulation in this case. However, there is confusion of meaning as both connotations are used interchangeably in its application in different contexts by different ecologists.

==== Naturalism ====
There is yet to be a defined explanation of naturalism within philosophy of ecology, however, its current usage connotes the idea that underlines a system containing a reality subsumed by nature, independent of the ‘supernatural’ world or existence. Naturalism, asserts the notion that scientific methodology is sufficient to obtain knowledge about reality. Naturalists who support this perspective view mental, biological, and social operations as physical entities. For example, considering a pebble or a human being, these existences occur concurrently within the same space and time. Applications of these scientific methods remain relevant and sufficient as it explains the spatiotemporal processes that physical entities undergo as spatiotemporal beings.

== Methodology ==
=== Holism vs reductionism ===
The holism-reductionism debate encompasses ontological, methodological and epistemic concerns. Common questions involve examining whether the means to understanding an object is through critical analyses of its constituents (reductionism) or ‘contextualisation’ of its components (holism) to retain phenomenological value. Holists maintain that certain unique properties are attributed to the abiotic or biotic entity, such as an ecosystem, and how these characteristics are not intrinsically applicable to its separate components. Analysis of just the parts are insufficient in obtaining knowledge of the entire unit. On the other spectrum, reductionists argue that these parts are independent of each other, and that knowledge of the components provide understanding of the composite entity. This approach, however, has been criticised, as the entity does not just denote just the unity of its aggregates but rather a synthesis between the whole and its parts.

=== Rationalism vs empiricism ===
Rationalism within scientific ecology such methodologies remain necessary and relevant in their role for establishing ecological theory as a guide. Methodology employed under rationalist approaches became pronounced in the 1920s by Alfred Lotka's (1956) and Vito Volterra's (1926) logistic models that are known as Lotka-Volterra equations. Empiricism establishes the need for observational and empirical testing. An obvious consequence of this paradigm is the presence and usage of pluralistic methodology, although there has yet to be a unifying model adequate for application in ecology, and neither has there yet to establish a pluralistic theory as well.

== Environmental ethics ==
Environmental ethics emerged in the 1970s in response to traditional anthropocentrism. It studies the moral implications between social and environmental interactions, prompted from concerns of environmental degradation, and challenged the ethical positionality of humans. A common belief amongst environmental philosophy is the view that biological entities are morally valuable and independent of human standards. Within this field, there is the shared assumption that environmental issues are prominently anthropogenic, and that this stems from an anthropocentric argument. The basis in rejecting anthropocentrism is to refute the belief that non-human entities are not worthy of value.

A main concern in environmental ethics is anthropogenically induced mass extinction within the biosphere. The attempt to interpret it non-anthropocentrically is vital to the foundations of environmental ethics. Paleontology, for example, details mass extinction as pivotal and a precursor to major radiations. Those with non-anthropocentric views interpret the death of dinosaurs as a preservation of biodiversity and principle to anthropocentric values. As ecology is closely entwined with ethics, understanding environmental approaches require understanding the world, which is the role of ecology and environmental ethics. The main issue is to also incorporate natural entities in its ethical concern, which involves conscious, sentient, living and existing beings.

== Mathematical models ==
Mathematical models play a role in questioning the issues presented in ecology and conservation biology. There are mainly two types of models used to explore the relationship between applications of mathematics and practice within ecology. The first are descriptive models, which details single-species population growth, for example, and multi-species models like Lotka-Volterra predator-prey models or Nicholson-Baily host-parasitoid model. These models explain behavioural activity through the idealisation of the intended target. The second type are normative models, which describe the current state of variables and how certain variables should behave.

In ecology, complicated biological interactions require explanation, which is where the models are used to investigate hypotheses. For example, identification and explanations of certain organisms and population abundance is essential for understanding the role of ecology and biodiversity. Applications of equations provide an inclination towards a prediction, or a model to suggest an answer for these questions that come up. Mathematical model in particular also provide contextual supporting information regarding factors on a wider, more global scale as well.

The purpose of these models and the differences in normative models and scientific models is that the differences in their standards entail different applications. These models aid in illustrating decision making outcomes, and also aid in tackling group decisions. For example, mathematical models incorporate environmental decisions of people within a group holistically. The model helps represent the values of each members, and the weightings of respect in the matrix. The model will then deliver the final result. In the case of conflict about proceedings or how to represent certain quantities, the model may be limited in that it would be deemed not of use. Furthermore, the number of idealisations in the model are also presented.

=== Criticisms ===
The process of mathematical modelling presents distinction between reality and theory, or more specifically, the application of models against the genuine phenomena these models aim to represent. Critics of the employment of mathematical models within ecology question its use and the extent of their relevance, prompted by an imbalance in investigative procedure and theoretical propositions. According to Weiner (1995), deterministic models have been ineffectual within ecology. The Lotka-Volterra models, Weiner argues, have not yielded testable predictions. In cases where theoretical models within ecology produced testable predictions, they have been refuted.

The purpose of the Lotka-Volterra models is to track the predator and prey interaction and their population cycles. The usual pattern maintains that the predator population follows the prey population fluctuations. For example, as prey population increase, so does the predator, and likewise in prey population decrease, predator population decreases. However, Weiner argues that, in reality, prey population still maintains their oscillating cycles, even if the predator is removed, and is an inaccurate representation of natural phenomena. Criticism in how idealisation is inherent within modelling and application of this is methodologically deficient. They also maintain that mathematical modelling within ecology is an oversimplification of reality, and a misrepresentation or insufficient representation of the biological system.

Application of simple or complex models are also up for debate. There is concern regarding the model results, wherein complexities of a system are not able to be replicated or adequately captured with a complicated model.

== See also ==
- Chemical ecology
- Circles of Sustainability
- Cultural ecology
- Dialectical naturalism
- Ecological death
- Ecological psychology
- Ecology movement
- Ecosophy
- Ecopsychology
- Industrial ecology
- Information ecology
- Landscape ecology
- Natural resource
- Normative science
- Political ecology
- Sensory ecology
- Spiritual ecology
- Sustainable development
