= Ecology =

Study of organisms and their environment

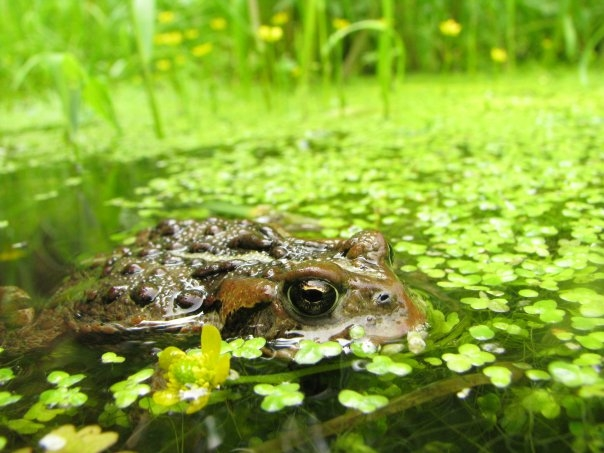
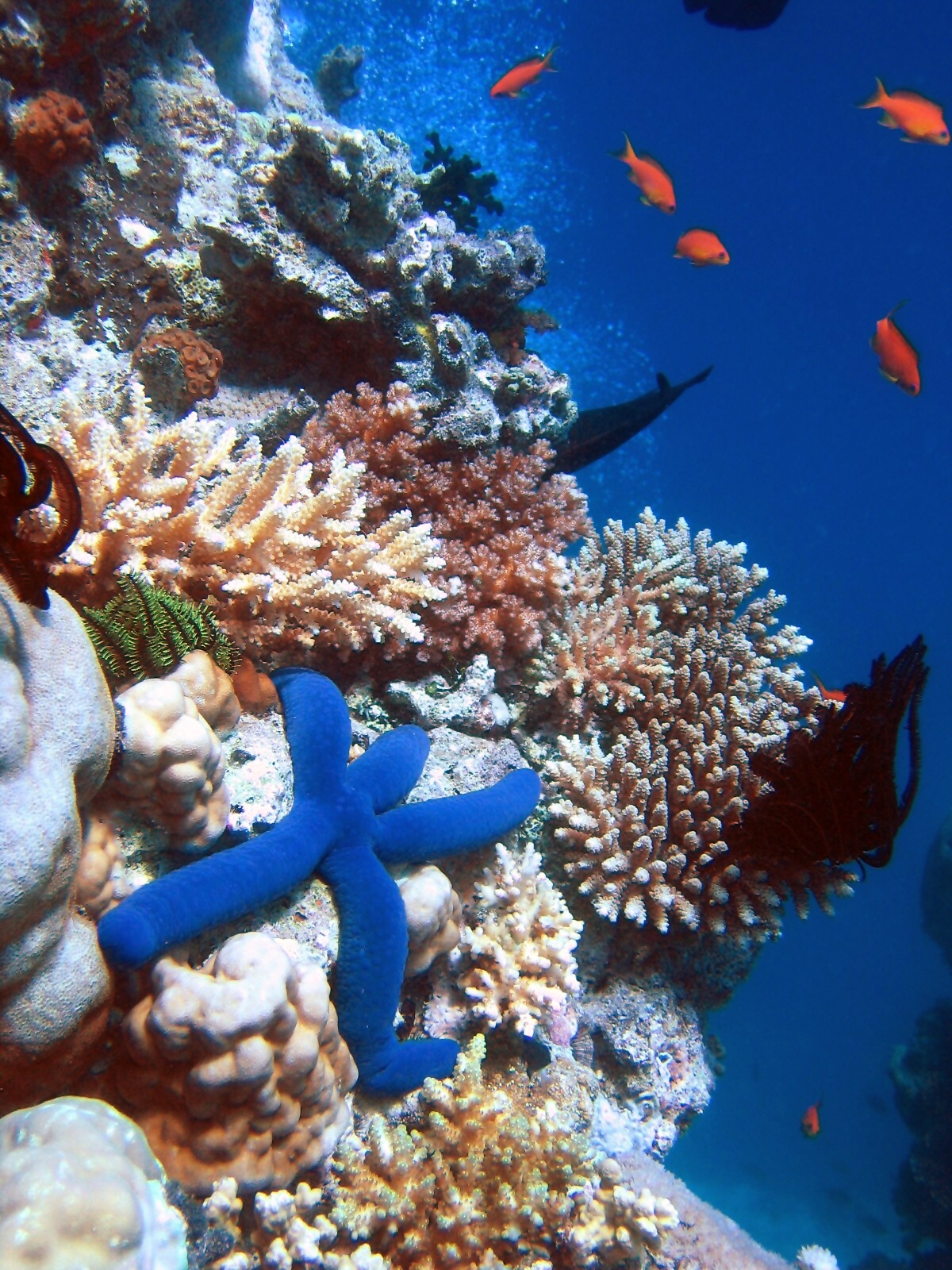
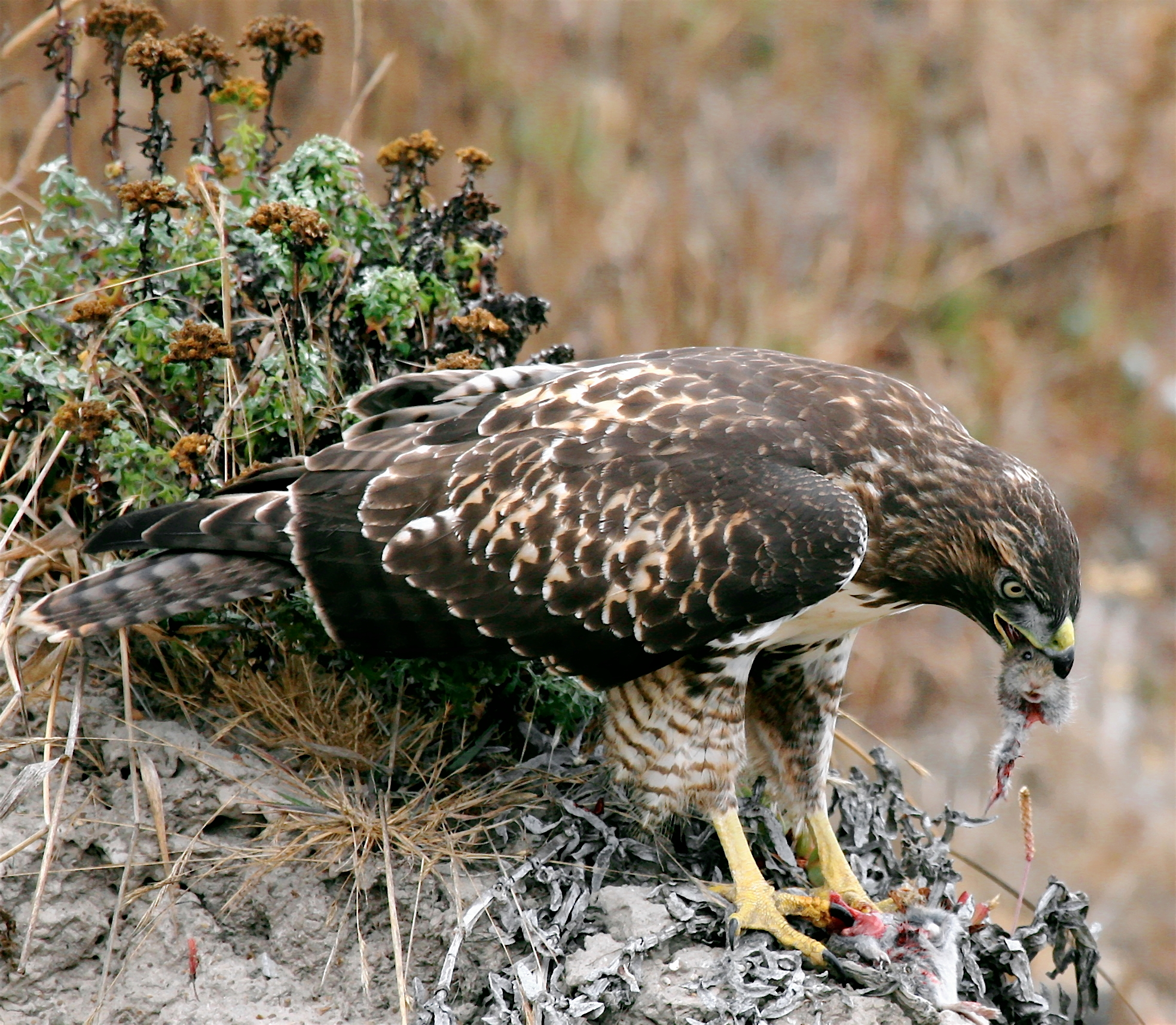
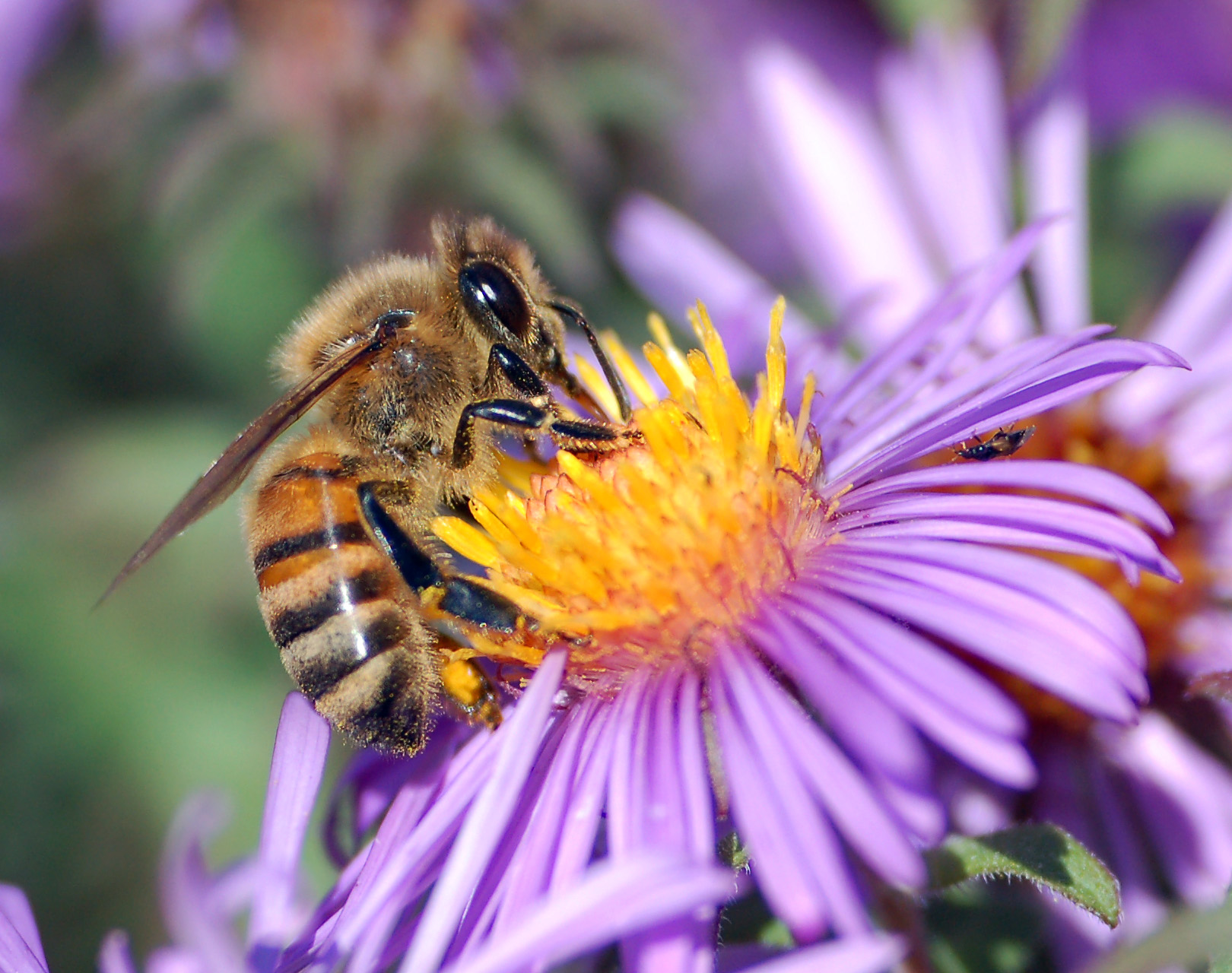
Ecology addresses the full scale of life, from tiny bacteria to processes that span the entire planet. Ecologists study many diverse and complex relations among species, such as predation and pollination. The diversity of life is organized into different habitats, from terrestrial to aquatic ecosystems.

Ecology (from Ancient Greek οἶκος (oîkos) 'house' and -λογία (-logía) 'study of') is the natural science which studies the interactions between organisms and their environments. Ecology considers organisms at the community, ecosystem, and biosphere levels. Ecology overlaps with the sciences of biogeography, evolutionary biology, genetics, and ethology.

Ecology is a branch of biology, and involves the study of abundance, biomass, and distribution of organisms in the context of the environment. It encompasses life processes, interactions, and adaptations; movement of materials and energy through living communities; successional development of ecosystems; cooperation, competition, and predation within and between species; and patterns of biodiversity and its effect on ecosystem processes.

Ecology has practical applications in fields such as conservation biology, wetland management, natural resource management, and human ecology.

The term ecology (German: Ökologie) was coined in 1866 by the German scientist Ernst Haeckel. The science of ecology as it is known today began with a group of American botanists in the 1890s. Evolutionary concepts relating to adaptation and natural selection are cornerstones of modern ecological theory.

Ecosystems are dynamically interacting systems of organisms, the communities they make up, and the non-living (abiotic) components of their environment. Ecosystem processes, such as primary production, nutrient cycling, and niche construction, regulate the flux of energy and matter through an environment. Ecosystems have biophysical feedback mechanisms that moderate processes acting on living (biotic) and abiotic components of the planet. Ecosystems sustain life-supporting functions and provide ecosystem services such as biomass production (food, fuel, fiber, and medicine), the regulation of climate, global biogeochemical cycles, water filtration, soil formation, erosion control, flood protection, and many other natural features of scientific, historical, economic, or intrinsic value.

== Levels, scope, and scale of organization ==
Ecosystems vary from tiny to vast. A single tree is of little consequence to the classification of a forest ecosystem, but is critically relevant to organisms living in and on it. Several generations of an aphid population can exist over the lifespan of a single leaf. Each of those aphids, in turn, supports diverse bacterial communities. The nature of connections in ecological communities cannot be explained by knowing the details of each species in isolation, because the emergent pattern is neither revealed nor predicted until the ecosystem is studied as an integrated whole.

The main subdisciplines of ecology, population (or community) ecology and ecosystem ecology, differ in their contrasting paradigms. The former focuses on organisms' distribution and abundance, while the latter focuses on materials and energy fluxes.

=== Hierarchy ===
To structure the study of ecology into a conceptually manageable framework, the biological world is organized into a hierarchy, ranging in scale from (as far as ecology is concerned) organisms, to populations, to guilds, to communities, to ecosystems, to biomes, and up to the level of the biosphere. This framework forms a panarchy and exhibits non-linear behaviors; this means that "effect and cause are disproportionate, so that small changes to critical variables, such as the number of nitrogen fixers, can lead to disproportionate, perhaps irreversible, changes in the system properties."

=== Biodiversity ===
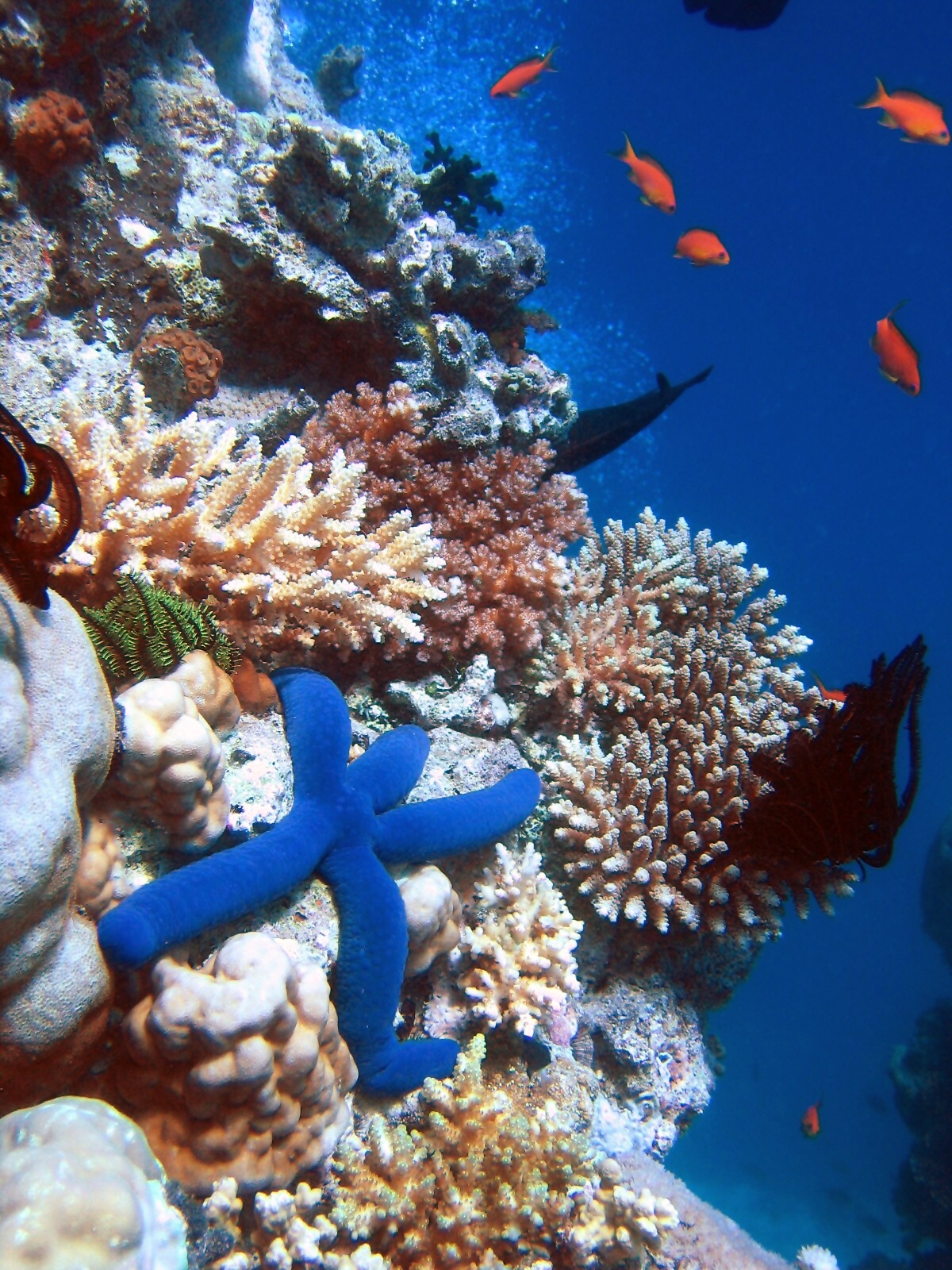
Biodiversity of a coral reef. Corals adapt to and modify their environment by forming calcium carbonate skeletons. This provides growing conditions for future generations and forms a habitat for many other species.

Biodiversity (an abbreviation of "biological diversity") describes the diversity of life from genes to ecosystems and spans every level of biological organization. The term has several interpretations, and there are many ways to index, measure, characterize, and represent its complex organization. Biodiversity includes species diversity, ecosystem diversity, and genetic diversity and scientists are interested in the way that this diversity affects the complex ecological processes operating at and among these respective levels.

Biodiversity plays an important role in ecosystem services which by definition maintain and improve human quality of life. It delivers ecosystem services across heterogeneous real-world landscapes, influenced by human management and environmental conditions. Conservation priorities and management techniques require different approaches and considerations to address the full ecological scope of biodiversity. Natural capital that supports populations is critical for maintaining ecosystem services and species migration (e.g., riverine fish runs and avian insect control) has been implicated as one mechanism by which those service losses are experienced. An understanding of biodiversity has practical applications for species and ecosystem-level conservation planners as they make management recommendations to consulting firms, governments, and industry.

=== Habitat ===
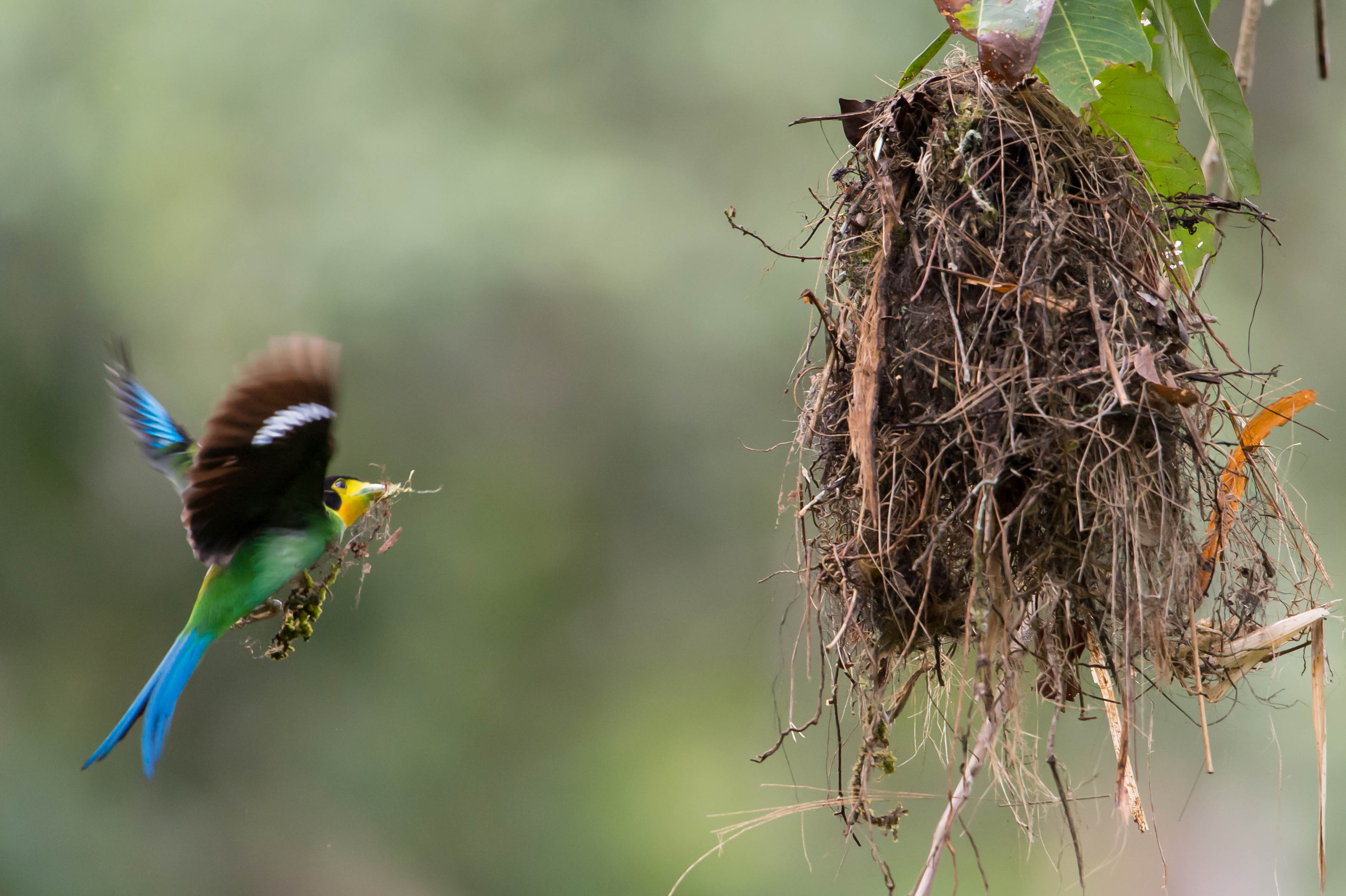
Long-tailed broadbill building its nest

The habitat of a species describes the environment over which it occurs and the type of community that is formed. More specifically, "habitats can be defined as regions in environmental space that are composed of multiple dimensions, each representing a biotic or abiotic environmental variable; that is, any component or characteristic of the environment related directly (e.g. forage biomass and quality) or indirectly (e.g. elevation) to the use of a location by the animal."

=== Niche ===
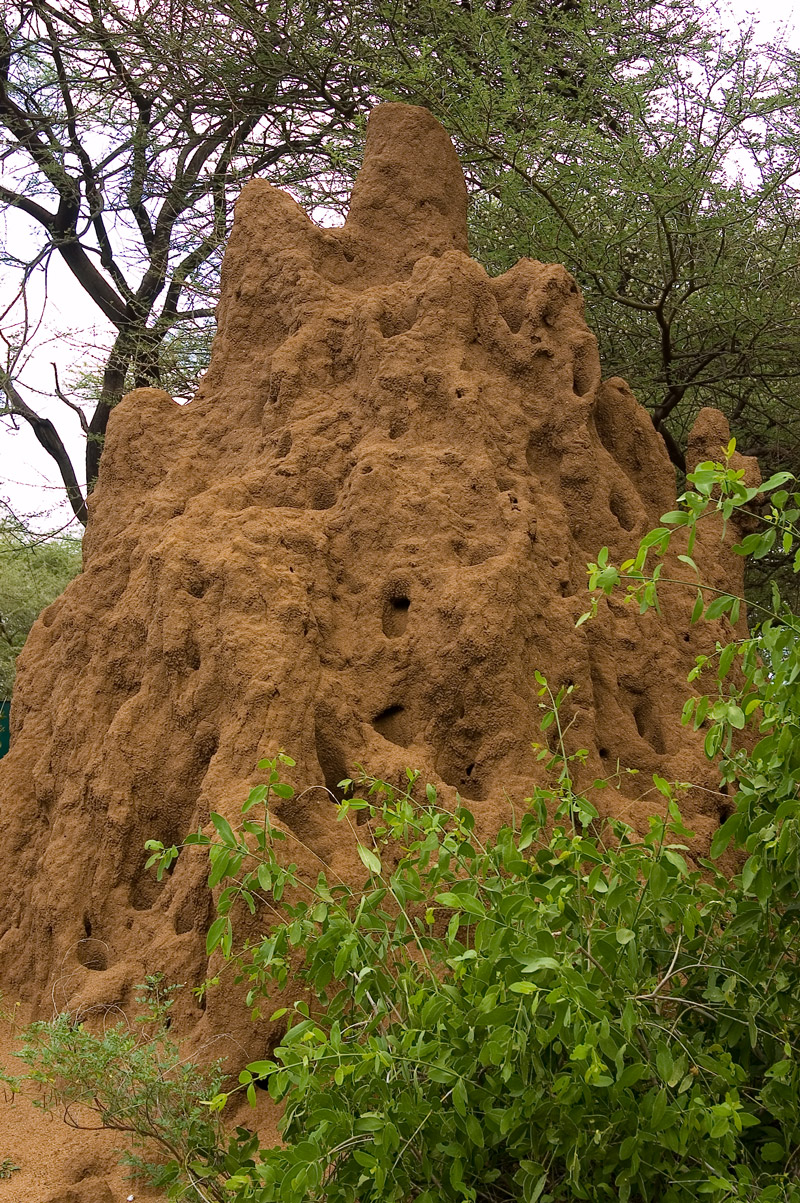
Termite mounds with varied heights of chimneys regulate gas exchange, temperature and other environmental parameters that are needed to sustain the internal physiology of the entire colony.

Definitions of niche date back to 1917. In 1957, G. Evelyn Hutchinson introduced "the set of biotic and abiotic conditions in which a species is able to persist and maintain stable population sizes." The niche is a central concept in the ecology of organisms and is sub-divided into fundamental and realized niches. The fundamental niche is the set of environmental conditions under which a species is able to persist. The realized niche is the set of environmental plus ecological conditions under which a species persists. The Hutchinsonian niche is defined more technically as a "Euclidean hyperspace whose dimensions are defined as environmental variables and whose size is a function of the number of values that the environmental values may assume for which an organism has positive fitness."

=== Niche construction ===
Organisms are subject to environmental pressures, but they also modify their habitats. The regulatory feedback between organisms and their environment can affect conditions from local (e.g., a beaver pond) to global scales, over time and even after death, such as decaying logs or silica skeleton deposits from marine organisms. Ecosystem engineering is related to niche construction, but the former relates only to the physical modifications of the habitat whereas the latter also considers the evolutionary implications of physical changes to the environment and feedback on natural selection. Ecosystem engineers are defined as: "organisms that directly or indirectly modulate the availability of resources to other species, by causing physical state changes in biotic or abiotic materials. In so doing they modify, maintain and create habitats."

=== Biome ===
Biomes are larger units of organization that categorize regions of the Earth's ecosystems, mainly according to the structure and composition of vegetation. There are different methods to define the continental boundaries of biomes dominated by different functional types of vegetative communities that are limited in distribution by climate, precipitation, weather, and other environmental variables. Biomes include tropical rainforest, temperate broadleaf and mixed forest, temperate deciduous forest, taiga, tundra, hot desert, and polar desert. Other researchers have recently categorized other biomes, such as the human and oceanic microbiomes. To a microbe, the human body is a habitat and a landscape. Microbiomes were discovered largely through advances in molecular genetics, which have revealed a hidden richness of microbial diversity on the planet. The oceanic microbiome plays a significant role in the ecological biogeochemistry of the planet's oceans.

=== Biosphere ===
The largest scale of ecological organization is the biosphere: the total sum of ecosystems on the planet. Ecological relationships regulate the flux of energy, nutrients, and climate all the way up to the planetary scale. For example, the dynamic history of the planetary atmosphere's CO_{2} and O_{2} composition has been affected by the biogenic flux of gases coming from respiration and photosynthesis, with levels fluctuating over time in relation to the ecology and evolution of plants and animals. Ecological theory has also been used to explain self-emergent regulatory phenomena at the planetary scale: for example, the Gaia hypothesis is an example of holism applied in ecological theory. The Gaia hypothesis states that there is an emergent feedback loop generated by the metabolism of living organisms that maintains the core temperature of the Earth and atmospheric conditions within a narrow self-regulating range of tolerance.

=== Population ecology ===
Population ecology studies the dynamics of species populations and how these populations interact with the wider environment. A population consists of individuals of the same species that live, interact, and migrate through the same niche and habitat.

A primary law of population ecology is the Malthusian growth model which states, "a population will grow (or decline) exponentially as long as the environment experienced by all individuals in the population remains constant." Simplified population models usually starts with four variables: death, birth, immigration, and emigration.

An example of an introductory population model describes a closed population, such as on an island, where immigration and emigration does not take place. Hypotheses are evaluated with reference to a null hypothesis which states that random processes create the observed data. In these island models, the rate of population change is described by:

$$\frac{\operatorname{d}N(t)}{\operatorname{d}t}=bN(t) - dN(t)=(b - d)N(t)=rN(t),$$

where N is the total number of individuals in the population, b and d are the per capita rates of birth and death respectively, and r is the per capita rate of population change.

Using these modeling techniques, Malthus' population principle of growth was later transformed into a model known as the logistic equation by Pierre Verhulst:

$$\frac{\operatorname{d}N(t)}{\operatorname{d}t}=rN(t) - \alpha N(t)^2=rN(t)\left(\frac{K - N(t)}{K}\right),$$

where N(t) is the number of individuals measured as biomass density as a function of time, t, r is the maximum per-capita rate of change commonly known as the intrinsic rate of growth, and $\alpha$ is the crowding coefficient, which represents the reduction in population growth rate per individual added. The formula states that the rate of change in population size ($\mathrm{d}N(t)/\mathrm{d}t$) will grow to approach equilibrium, where ($\mathrm{d}N(t)/\mathrm{d}t=0$), when the rates of increase and crowding are balanced, $r/\alpha$. A common, analogous model fixes the equilibrium, $r/\alpha$ as K, which is known as the "carrying capacity."

Population ecology builds upon these introductory models to further understand demographic processes in real study populations. Commonly used types of data include life history, fecundity, and survivorship, and these are analyzed using mathematical techniques such as matrix algebra. The information is used for managing wildlife stocks and setting harvest quotas. In cases where basic models are insufficient, ecologists may adopt different kinds of statistical methods, such as the Akaike information criterion, or use models that can become mathematically complex as "several competing hypotheses are simultaneously confronted with the data."

=== Metapopulations and migration ===
The concept of metapopulations was defined in 1969 as "a population of populations which go extinct locally and recolonize". Metapopulation ecology is another statistical approach that is often used in conservation research. Metapopulation models simplify the landscape into patches of varying levels of quality, and metapopulations are linked by the migratory behaviours of organisms. Animal migration is set apart from other kinds of movement because it involves the seasonal departure and return of individuals from a habitat. Migration is also a population-level phenomenon, as with the migration routes followed by plants as they occupied northern post-glacial environments. Plant ecologists use pollen records that accumulate and stratify in wetlands to reconstruct the timing of plant migration and dispersal relative to historic and contemporary climates. These migration routes involved an expansion of the range as plant populations expanded from one area to another. There is a larger taxonomy of movement, such as commuting, foraging, territorial behavior, stasis, and ranging. Dispersal is usually distinguished from migration because it involves the one-way permanent movement of individuals from their birth population into another population.

=== Community ecology ===
Community ecology examines how interactions among species and their environment affect the abundance, distribution and diversity of species within communities.

— Johnson & Stinchcomb (2007)

Community ecology is the study of the interactions among a collection of species that inhabit the same geographic area. Community ecologists study the determinants of patterns and processes for two or more interacting species. Research in community ecology might measure species diversity in grasslands in relation to soil fertility. It might also include the analysis of predator-prey dynamics, competition among similar plant species, or mutualistic interactions between crabs and corals.

=== Ecosystem ecology ===
These ecosystems, as we may call them, are of the most various kinds and sizes. They form one category of the multitudinous physical systems of the universe, which range from the universe as a whole down to the atom.

— Tansley (1935)

The underlying concept of an ecosystem can be traced back to 1864 in the published work of George Perkins Marsh ("Man and Nature"). Ecosystems may be habitats within biomes that form an integrated whole and a dynamically responsive system having both physical and biological complexes. Ecosystem ecology is the science of determining the fluxes of materials (e.g. carbon, phosphorus) between different pools (e.g., tree biomass, soil organic material). Ecosystem ecologists attempt to determine the underlying causes of these fluxes. Research in ecosystem ecology might measure primary production (g C/m^2) in a wetland in relation to decomposition and consumption rates (g C/m^2/y). This requires an understanding of the community connections between plants (i.e., primary producers) and the decomposers (e.g., fungi and bacteria).

=== Food webs ===
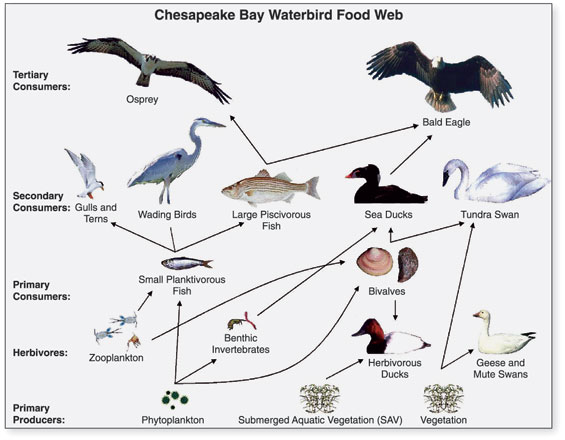
Generalized food web of waterbirds from Chesapeake Bay

A food web is the archetypal ecological network. Plants capture solar energy and use it to synthesize simple sugars during photosynthesis. As plants grow, they accumulate nutrients and are eaten by grazing herbivores, and the energy is transferred through a chain of organisms by consumption. The simplified linear feeding pathways that move from a basal trophic species to a top consumer is called the food chain. Food chains in an ecological community create a complex food web. Food webs are a type of concept map used to illustrate and study pathways of energy and material flows.

=== Trophic levels ===
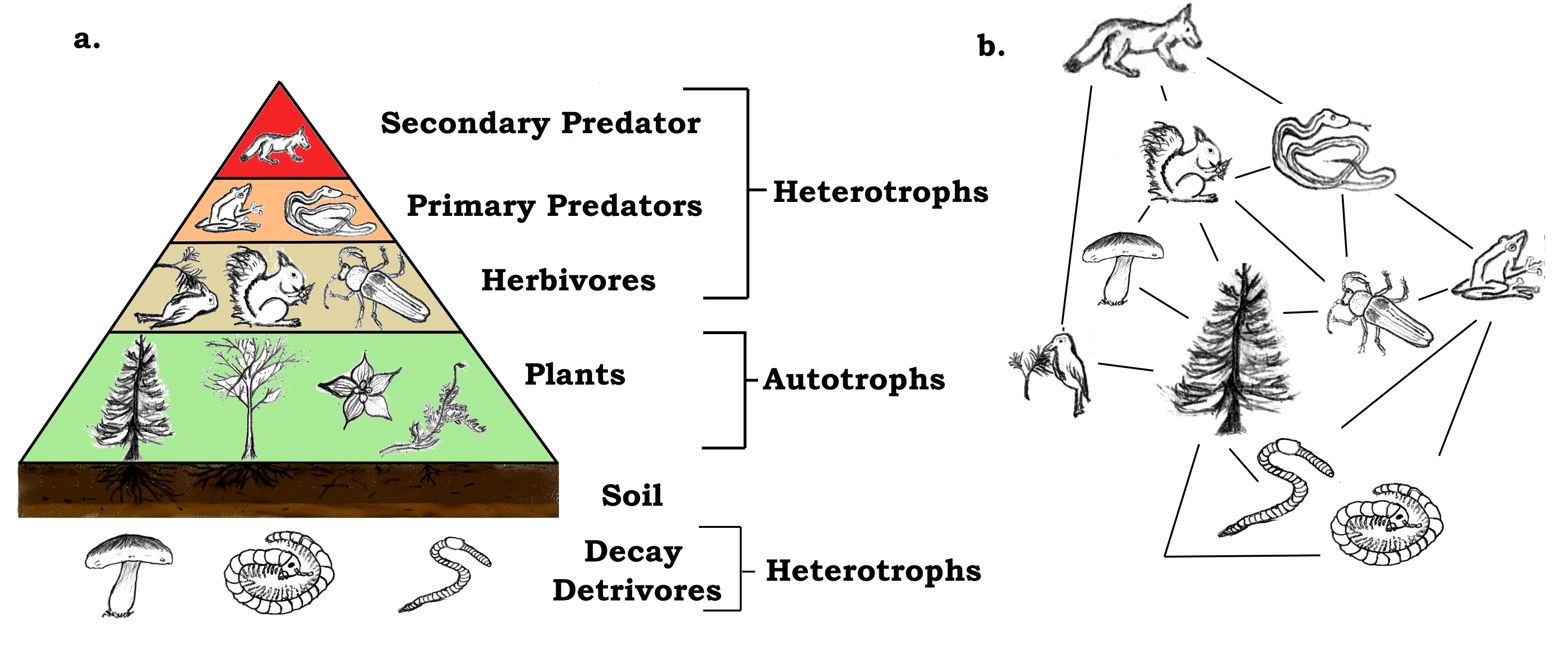
A trophic pyramid (a) and a food-web (b) illustrating ecological relationships among creatures that are typical of a northern boreal terrestrial ecosystem. The trophic pyramid roughly represents the biomass (usually measured as total dry-weight) at each level. Plants generally have the greatest biomass. Names of trophic categories are shown to the right of the pyramid. Some ecosystems, such as many wetlands, do not organize as a strict pyramid, because aquatic plants are not as productive as long-lived terrestrial plants such as trees. Ecological trophic pyramids are typically one of three kinds: 1) pyramid of numbers, 2) pyramid of biomass, or 3) pyramid of energy.

A trophic level (from Greek troph, τροφή, trophē, meaning "food" or "feeding") is "a group of organisms acquiring a considerable majority of its energy from the lower adjacent level (according to ecological pyramids) nearer the abiotic source." Links in food webs primarily connect feeding relations or trophism among species. Biodiversity within ecosystems can be organized into trophic pyramids, in which the vertical dimension represents feeding relations that become further removed from the base of the food chain up toward top predators, and the horizontal dimension represents the abundance or biomass at each level. When the relative abundance or biomass of each species is sorted into its respective trophic level, they naturally sort into a 'pyramid of numbers'.

Species are broadly categorized as autotrophs (or primary producers), heterotrophs (or consumers), and Detritivores (or decomposers). Autotrophs are organisms that produce their own food (production is greater than respiration) by photosynthesis or chemosynthesis. Heterotrophs are organisms that must feed on others for nourishment and energy (respiration exceeds production). Heterotrophs can be further sub-divided into different functional groups, including primary consumers (strict herbivores), secondary consumers (carnivorous predators that feed exclusively on herbivores), and tertiary consumers (predators that feed on a mix of herbivores and predators). Omnivores do not fit neatly into a functional category because they eat both plant and animal tissues. It has been suggested that omnivores have a greater functional influence as predators because compared to herbivores, they are relatively inefficient at grazing.

Trophic levels are part of the holistic or complex systems view of ecosystems. Each trophic level contains unrelated species that are grouped together because they share common ecological functions, giving a macroscopic view of the system. While the notion of trophic levels provides insight into energy flow and top-down control within food webs, it is troubled by the prevalence of omnivory in real ecosystems. This has led some ecologists to "reiterate that the notion that species clearly aggregate into discrete, homogeneous trophic levels is fiction." Nonetheless, recent studies have shown that real trophic levels do exist, but "above the herbivore trophic level, food webs are better characterized as a tangled web of omnivores."

=== Keystone species ===
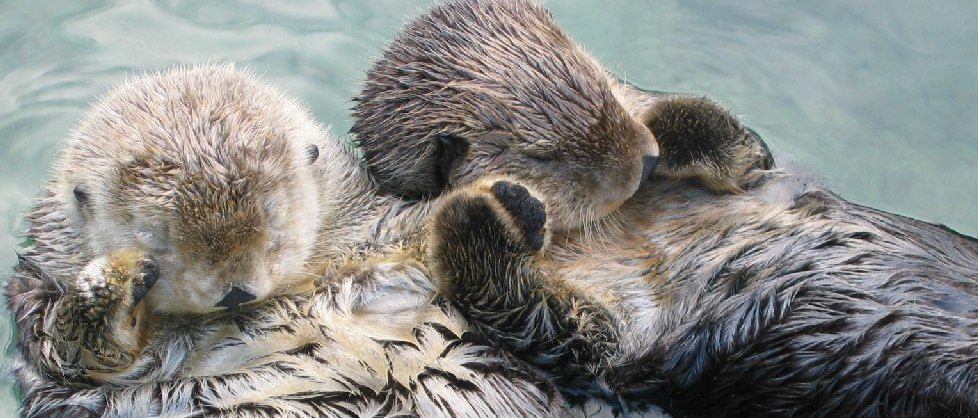
Sea otters, an example of a keystone species

A keystone species is a species that is connected to a disproportionately large number of other species in the food-web. Keystone species have lower levels of biomass in the trophic pyramid relative to the importance of their role. The many connections that a keystone species holds means that it maintains the organization and structure of entire communities. The loss of a keystone species results in a range of dramatic cascading effects (termed trophic cascades) that alters trophic dynamics, other food web connections, and can cause the extinction of other species. The term keystone species was coined by Robert Paine in 1969 and is a reference to the keystone architectural feature as the removal of a keystone species can result in a community collapse just as the removal of the keystone in an arch can result in the arch's loss of stability. Sea otters (Enhydra lutris) are commonly cited as an example because they limit the density of sea urchins that feed on kelp. If sea otters are removed from the system, the urchins graze until the kelp beds disappear, and this has a dramatic effect on community structure.

== Complexity ==
Complexity is understood as a large computational effort needed to assemble numerous interacting parts. Global patterns of biological diversity are complex. This biocomplexity stems from the interplay among ecological processes that influence patterns at different scales, such as transitional areas or ecotones spanning landscapes. Complexity stems from the interplay among levels of biological organization as energy, and matter is integrated into larger units that superimpose onto the smaller parts. Small scale patterns do not necessarily explain larger ones, as in Aristotle's expression "the sum is greater than the parts". "Complexity in ecology is of at least six distinct types: spatial, temporal, structural, process, behavioral, and geometric." From these principles, ecologists have identified emergent and self-organizing phenomena that operate at different environmental scales of influence, ranging from molecular to planetary, and these require different explanations at each integrative level.

=== Holism ===
Holism is a critical part of the theory of ecology. Holism addresses the biological organization of life that self-organizes into layers of emergent whole systems that function according to non-reducible properties. This means that higher-order patterns of a whole functional system, such as an ecosystem, cannot be predicted or understood by a simple summation of the parts. "New properties emerge because the components interact, not because the basic nature of the components is changed."

== Relation to evolution ==
Ecology and evolutionary biology are sister disciplines. Natural selection, life history, development, adaptation, populations, and inheritance thread equally into both. In this framework, the analytical tools of ecologists and evolutionists overlap as they study life through phylogenetics or Linnaean taxonomy. There is no sharp boundary separating ecology from evolution, and they differ more in their areas of applied focus. Both explain properties and processes across different spatial or temporal scales of organization. Ecologists study the abiotic and biotic factors that influence evolutionary processes, and evolution can be rapid, occurring on ecological timescales as short as one generation.

=== Behavioural ecology ===
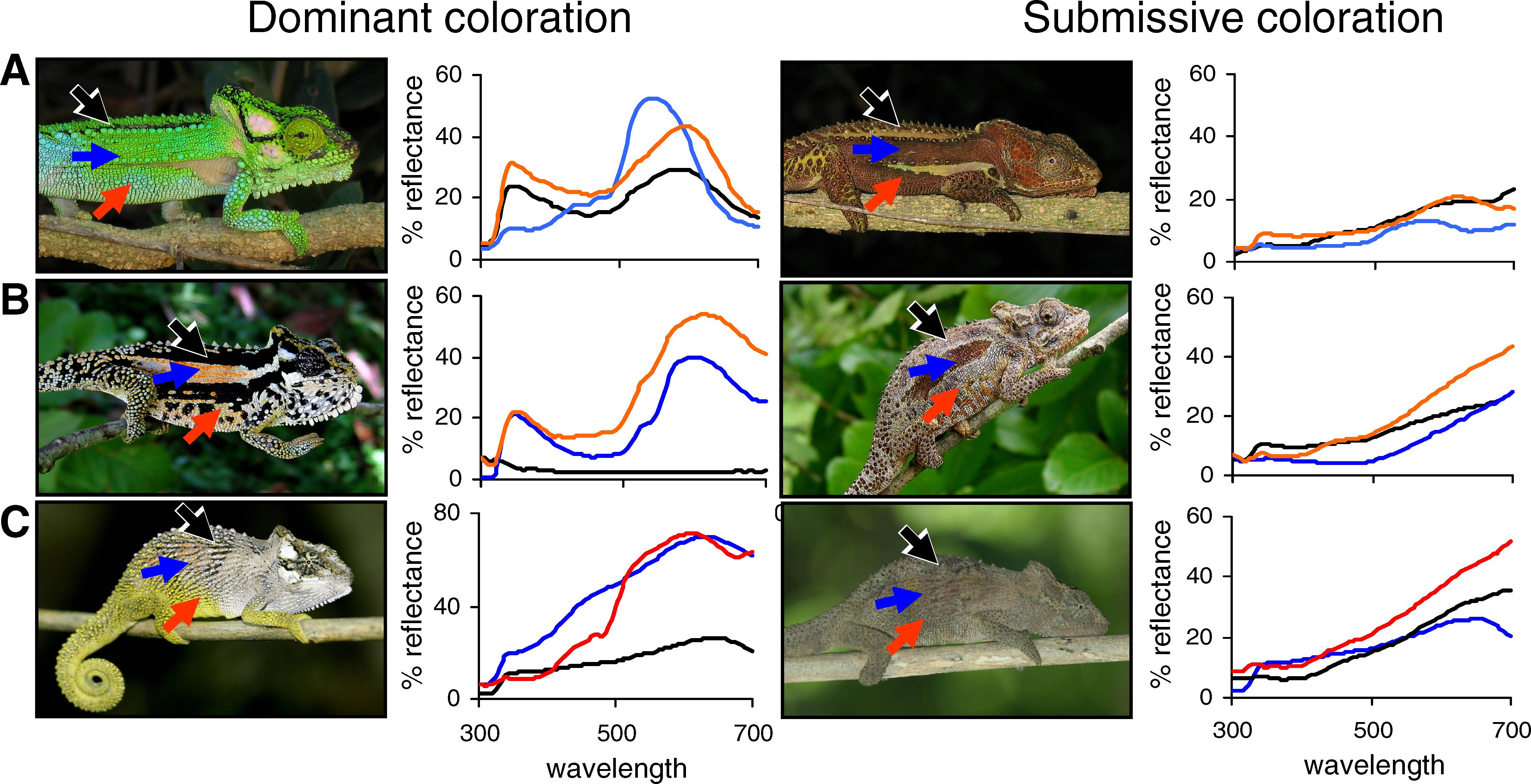
Social display and colour variation in differently adapted species of chameleons (Bradypodion spp.). Chameleons change their skin colour to match their background as a behavioural defence mechanism and also use colour to communicate with other members of their species, such as dominant (left) versus submissive (right) patterns shown in the three species (A-C) above.

All organisms have behaviours. Even plants express complex behaviour, including memory and communication. Behavioural ecology is the study of an organism's behaviour in its environment and its ecological and evolutionary implications. Ethology is the study of observable movement or behaviour in animals. This could include investigations of motile sperm of plants, mobile phytoplankton, zooplankton swimming toward the female egg, the cultivation of fungi by weevils, the mating dance of a salamander, or social gatherings of amoeba.

Adaptation is the central unifying concept in behavioural ecology. Behaviours can be recorded as traits and inherited in much the same way that eye and hair colour can. Behaviours can evolve by means of natural selection as adaptive traits conferring functional utilities that increases reproductive fitness.

=== Cognitive ecology ===
Cognitive ecology integrates theory and observations from evolutionary ecology and cognitive science, to understand the effect of animal interaction with their habitat on their cognitive systems. "Until recently, however, cognitive scientists have not paid sufficient attention to the fundamental fact that cognitive traits evolved under particular natural settings. With consideration of the selection pressure on cognition, cognitive ecology can contribute intellectual coherence to the multidisciplinary study of cognition."

=== Social ecology ===
Social-ecological behaviours are notable in the social insects, slime moulds, social spiders, human society, and naked mole-rats where eusocialism has evolved. Social behaviours include reciprocally beneficial behaviours among kin and nest mates and evolve from kin and group selection. Kin selection explains altruism through genetic relationships, whereby an altruistic behaviour leading to death is rewarded by the survival of genetic copies distributed among surviving relatives. The social insects, including ants, bees, and wasps are most famously studied for this type of relationship because the male drones are clones that share the same genetic make-up as every other male in the colony. In contrast, group selectionists find examples of altruism among non-genetic relatives and explain this through selection acting on the group; whereby, it becomes selectively advantageous for groups if their members express altruistic behaviours to one another. Groups with predominantly altruistic members survive better than groups with predominantly selfish members.

=== Coevolution ===
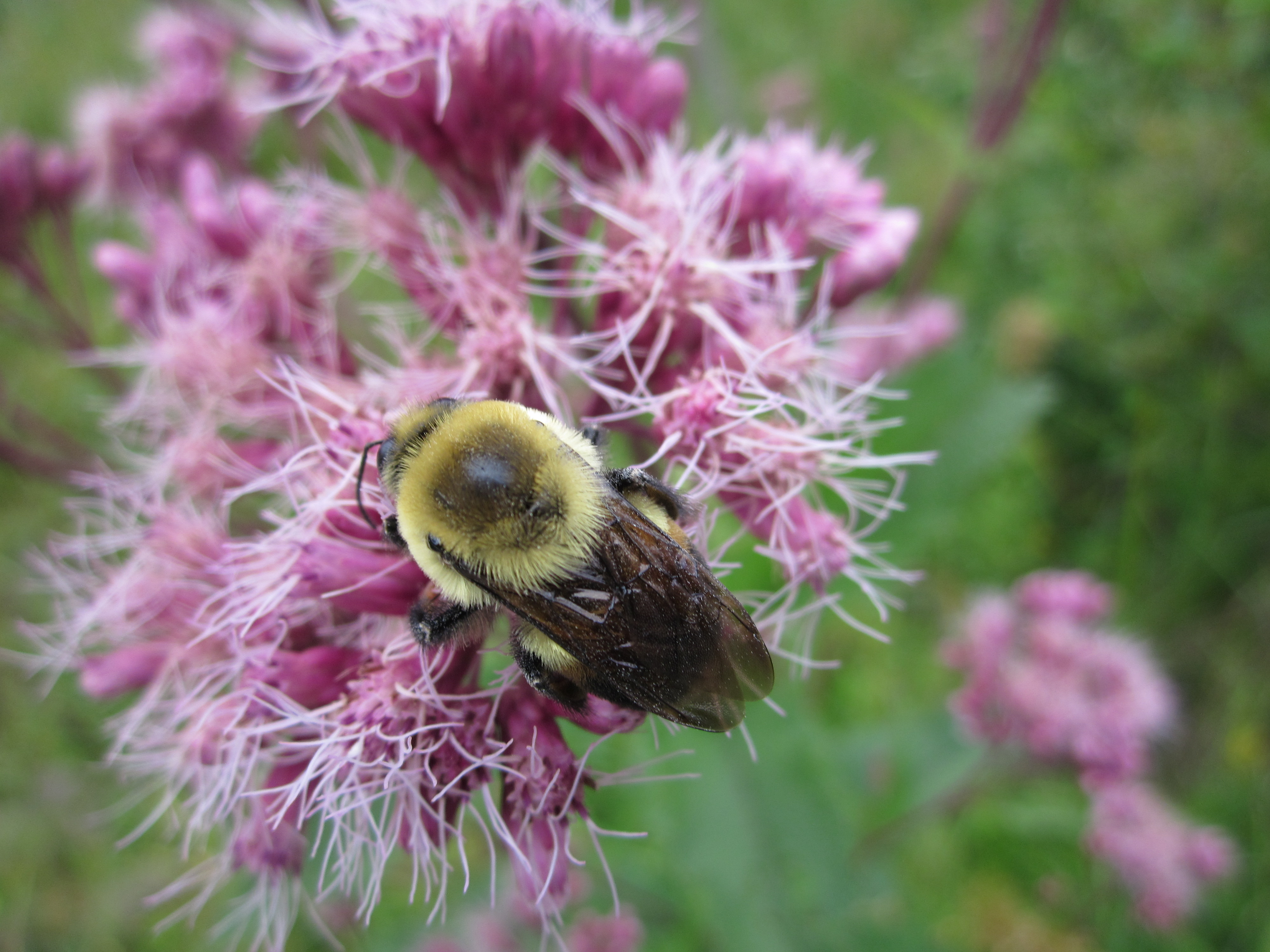
Bumblebees and the flowers they pollinate have coevolved so that both have become dependent on each other for survival.

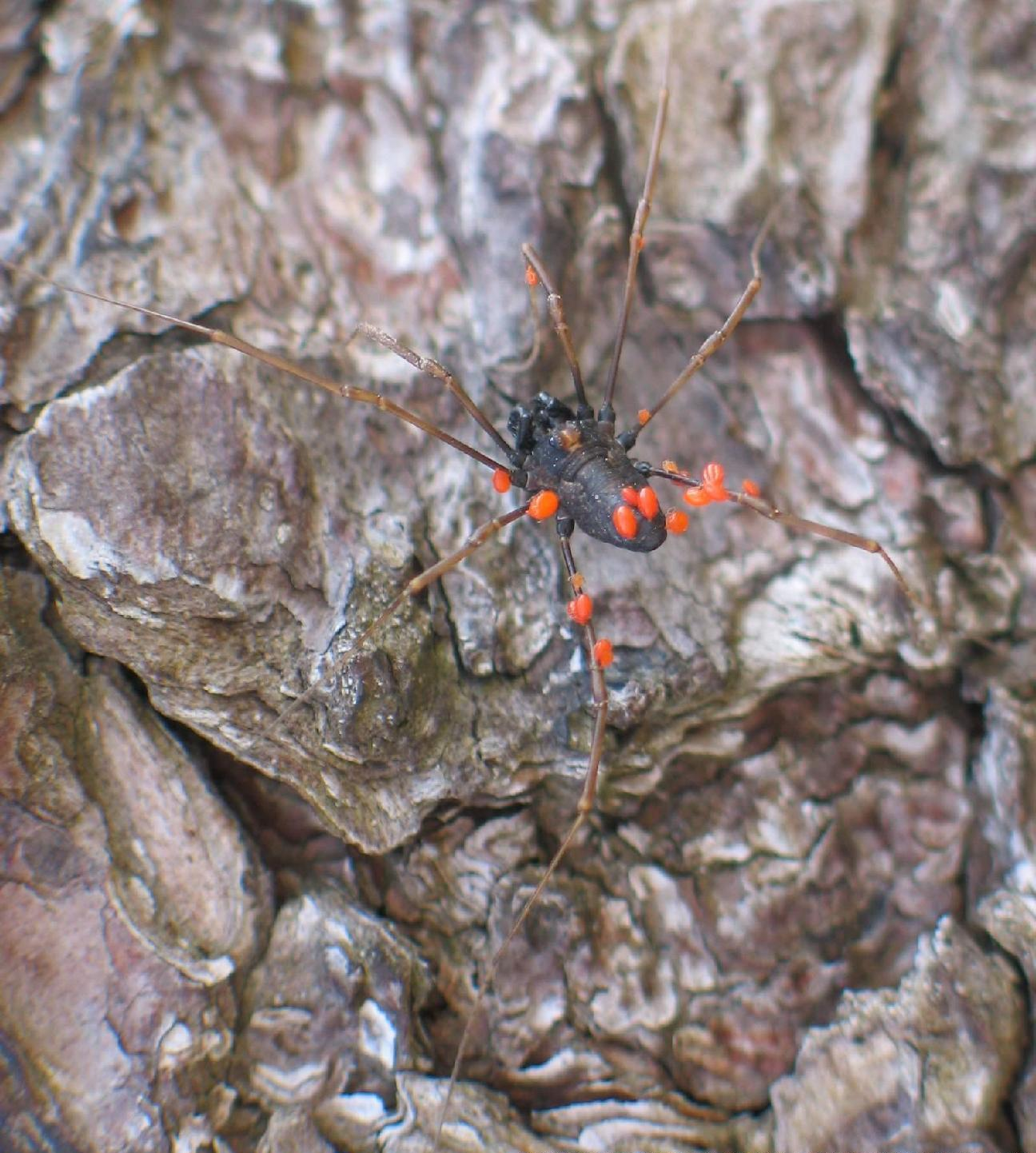
Parasitism: A harvestman arachnid being parasitized by mites. The harvestman is being consumed, while the mites benefit from traveling on and feeding off of their host.

Ecological interactions can be classified broadly into a host and an associate relationship. A host is any entity that harbours another that is called the associate. Relationships between species that are mutually or reciprocally beneficial are called mutualisms. Examples of mutualism include fungus-growing ants employing agricultural symbiosis, bacteria living in the guts of insects and other organisms, the fig wasp and yucca moth pollination complex, lichens with fungi and photosynthetic algae, and corals with photosynthetic algae. If there is a physical connection between host and associate, the relationship is called symbiosis. Approximately 60% of all plants, for example, have a symbiotic relationship with arbuscular mycorrhizal fungi living in their roots forming an exchange network of carbohydrates for mineral nutrients.

=== Biogeography ===
Biogeography is the comparative study of the geographic distribution of organisms and the corresponding evolution of their traits in space and time. The Journal of Biogeography was established in 1974. Biogeography and ecology share many of their disciplinary roots. Island biogeography, published by Robert MacArthur and Edward O. Wilson in 1967, is one of the fundamentals of ecological theory. Biogeography has a long history in the natural sciences concerning the spatial distribution of plants and animals. Ecology and evolution provide the explanatory context for biogeographical studies. Biogeographical patterns result from ecological processes that influence range distributions, such as migration and dispersal. and from historical processes that split populations or species into different areas. The biogeographic processes that result in the natural splitting of species explain much of the modern distribution of the Earth's biota. The splitting of lineages in a species is called vicariance biogeography and it is a sub-discipline of biogeography. There are also practical applications in the field of biogeography concerning ecological systems and processes. For example, the range and distribution of biodiversity and invasive species responding to climate change is a serious concern and active area of research in the context of global warming.

==== r/K selection theory ====
r/K selection theory is one of the first predictive models in ecology used to explain life-history evolution. Its premise is that natural selection varies with population density. For example, when an island is first colonized, density of individuals is low. The initial increase in population size is not limited by competition, leaving an abundance of available resources for rapid population growth. These early phases of population growth experience density-independent forces of natural selection, which is called r-selection. As the population becomes more crowded, it approaches the island's carrying capacity, thus forcing individuals to compete more heavily for fewer available resources. Under crowded conditions, the population experiences density-dependent forces of natural selection, called K-selection. In the r/K-selection model, the first variable r is the intrinsic rate of natural increase in population size and the second variable K is the carrying capacity of a population.

=== Molecular ecology ===
The relationship between ecology and genetic inheritance predates modern techniques for molecular analysis. Molecular ecological research became more feasible with the development of rapid and accessible genetic technologies, such as the polymerase chain reaction (PCR). The rise of molecular technologies and the influx of research questions into this new field resulted in the publication Molecular Ecology in 1992. Molecular ecology uses analytical techniques to study genes in an evolutionary and ecological context. In 1994, John Avise played a leading role in this area of science with the publication of his book, Molecular Markers, Natural History and Evolution.

== Human ecology ==
=== A dual discipline ===
Only within the moment of time represented by the present century has one species man acquired significant power to alter the nature of his world.

— Rachel Carson, "Silent Spring"

Ecology is both a biological science and a human science. Human ecology is an interdisciplinary investigation into the ecology of our species. "Human ecology may be defined: (1) from a bioecological standpoint as the study of man as the ecological dominant in plant and animal communities and systems; (2) from a bioecological standpoint as simply another animal affecting and being affected by his physical environment; and (3) as a human being, somehow different from animal life in general, interacting with physical and modified environments in a distinctive and creative way. A truly interdisciplinary human ecology will most likely address itself to all three." The term was formally introduced in 1921, but many sociologists, geographers, psychologists, and other disciplines were interested in human relations to natural systems centuries prior, especially in the late 19th century.

=== Restoration Ecology ===
Ecosystem management is not just about science nor is it simply an extension of traditional resource management; it offers a fundamental reframing of how humans may work with nature.

— Grumbine (1994)

Ecology is an employed science of restoration, repairing disturbed sites through human intervention, in natural resource management, and in environmental impact assessments. Edward O. Wilson predicted in 1992 that the 21st century "will be the era of restoration in ecology".

== Relation to the environment ==
The environment of ecosystems includes both physical parameters and biotic attributes. It is dynamically interlinked and contains resources for organisms at any time throughout their life cycle. Like ecology, the term environment has different conceptual meanings and overlaps with the concept of nature. Environment "includes the physical world, the social world of human relations and the built world of human creation." The physical environment is external to the level of biological organization under investigation, including abiotic factors such as temperature, radiation, light, chemistry, climate and geology. The biotic environment includes genes, cells, organisms, members of the same species (conspecifics) and other species that share a habitat.

=== Disturbance and resilience ===
A disturbance is any process that changes or removes biomass from a community, such as a fire, flood, drought, or predation. Disturbances are both the cause and product of natural fluctuations within an ecological community. Biodiversity can protect ecosystems from disturbances.

=== Metabolism and the early atmosphere ===
Metabolism – the rate at which energy and material resources are taken up from the environment, transformed within an organism, and allocated to maintenance, growth and reproduction – is a fundamental physiological trait.

— Ernest et al.

The Earth was formed approximately 4.5 billion years ago. As it cooled and a crust and oceans formed, its atmosphere transformed from being dominated by hydrogen to one composed mostly of methane and ammonia. Over the next billion years, the metabolic activity of life transformed the atmosphere into a mixture of carbon dioxide, nitrogen, and water vapor. These gases changed the way that light from the sun hit the Earth's surface and greenhouse effects trapped heat. There were untapped sources of free energy within the mixture of reducing and oxidizing gasses that set the stage for primitive ecosystems to evolve and, in turn, the atmosphere also evolved.

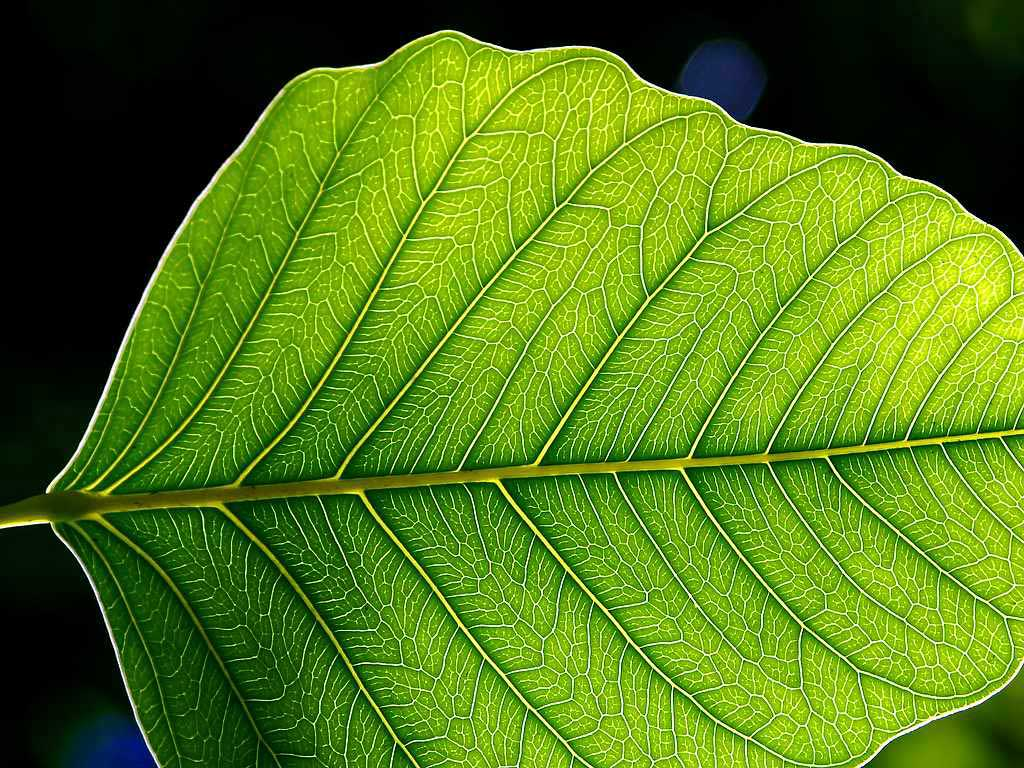
The leaf is the primary site of photosynthesis in many higher plants.

Throughout history, the Earth's atmosphere and biogeochemical cycles have been in a dynamic equilibrium with planetary ecosystems. The history is characterized by periods of significant transformation followed by millions of years of stability. The evolution of the earliest organisms, likely anaerobic methanogen microbes, started the process by converting atmospheric hydrogen into methane (4H_{2} + CO_{2} → CH_{4} + 2H_{2}O). Anoxygenic photosynthesis reduced hydrogen concentrations and increased atmospheric methane, by converting hydrogen sulfide into water or other sulfur compounds (for example, 2H_{2}S + CO_{2} + hv → CH_{2}O + H_{2}O + 2S). Early forms of fermentation also increased levels of atmospheric methane. The transition to an oxygen-dominant atmosphere (the Great Oxidation) did not begin until approximately 2.4–2.3 billion years ago, but photosynthetic processes started 0.3–1 billion years prior.

=== Radiation: heat, temperature and light ===
The biology of life operates within a certain range of temperatures. Heat is a form of energy that regulates temperature. Heat affects growth rates, activity, behaviour, and primary production. Temperature is largely dependent on the incidence of solar radiation. The latitudinal and longitudinal spatial variation of temperature greatly affects climates and consequently the distribution of biodiversity and levels of primary production in different ecosystems or biomes across the planet. Heat and temperature relate importantly to metabolic activity. Poikilotherms have a body temperature largely dependent on the temperature of the external environment. In contrast, homeotherms regulate their internal body temperature by expending metabolic energy. There is a relationship between light, primary production, and ecological energy budgets. Sunlight is the primary input of energy into the planet's ecosystems. Light is composed of electromagnetic energy of different wavelengths. Radiant energy from the sun generates heat, provides photons of light measured as active energy in the chemical reactions of life, and also acts as a catalyst for genetic mutation. Plants, algae, and some bacteria absorb light and assimilate the energy through photosynthesis. Organisms capable of assimilating energy by photosynthesis or through inorganic fixation of H_{2}S are autotrophs. Autotrophs—responsible for primary production—assimilate light energy which becomes metabolically stored as potential energy in the form of biochemical enthalpic bonds.

=== Physical environments ===
==== Water ====
Wetland conditions such as shallow water, high plant productivity, and anaerobic substrates provide a suitable environment for important physical, biological, and chemical processes. Because of these processes, wetlands play a vital role in global nutrient and element cycles.

— Cronk & Fennessy (2001)

Diffusion of carbon dioxide and oxygen is approximately 10,000 times slower in water than in air. When soils are flooded, they quickly lose oxygen, becoming hypoxic (an environment with O_{2} concentration below 2 mg/liter) and eventually completely anoxic where anaerobic bacteria thrive among the roots. Water influences the intensity and spectral composition of light as it reflects off the water surface and submerged particles. Salt water plants (halophytes) have additional specialized adaptations, such as the development of special organs for shedding salt and osmoregulating their internal salt (NaCl) concentrations, to live in estuarine, brackish, or oceanic environments. The physiology of fish is adapted to compensate for environmental salt levels through osmoregulation. Their gills form electrochemical gradients that mediate salt excretion in salt water and uptake in fresh water.

==== Gravity ====
The shape and energy of the land are significantly affected by gravitational forces. These govern many of the geophysical properties and distributions of biomes across the Earth. On the organismal scale, gravitational forces provide directional cues for plant and fungal growth (gravitropism), orientation cues for animal migrations, and influence the biomechanics and size of animals. Ecological traits, such as allocation of biomass in trees during growth are subject to mechanical failure as gravitational forces influence the position and structure of branches and leaves. The cardiovascular systems of animals are functionally adapted to overcome the pressure and gravitational forces that change according to the features of organisms (e.g., height, size, shape), their behaviour (e.g., diving, running, flying), and the habitat occupied (e.g., water, hot deserts, cold tundra).

==== Pressure ====
Climatic and osmotic pressure places physiological constraints on organisms, especially those that fly and respire at high altitudes, or dive to deep ocean depths. These constraints influence vertical limits of ecosystems in the biosphere, as organisms are physiologically sensitive and adapted to atmospheric and osmotic water pressure differences. For example, oxygen levels decrease with decreasing pressure and are a limiting factor for life at higher altitudes. Water transportation by plants is affected by osmotic pressure gradients. Water pressure in the depths of oceans requires that organisms adapt to these conditions. For example, diving animals such as whales, dolphins, and seals are adapted to deal with changes in sound due to water pressure differences.

==== Wind and turbulence ====
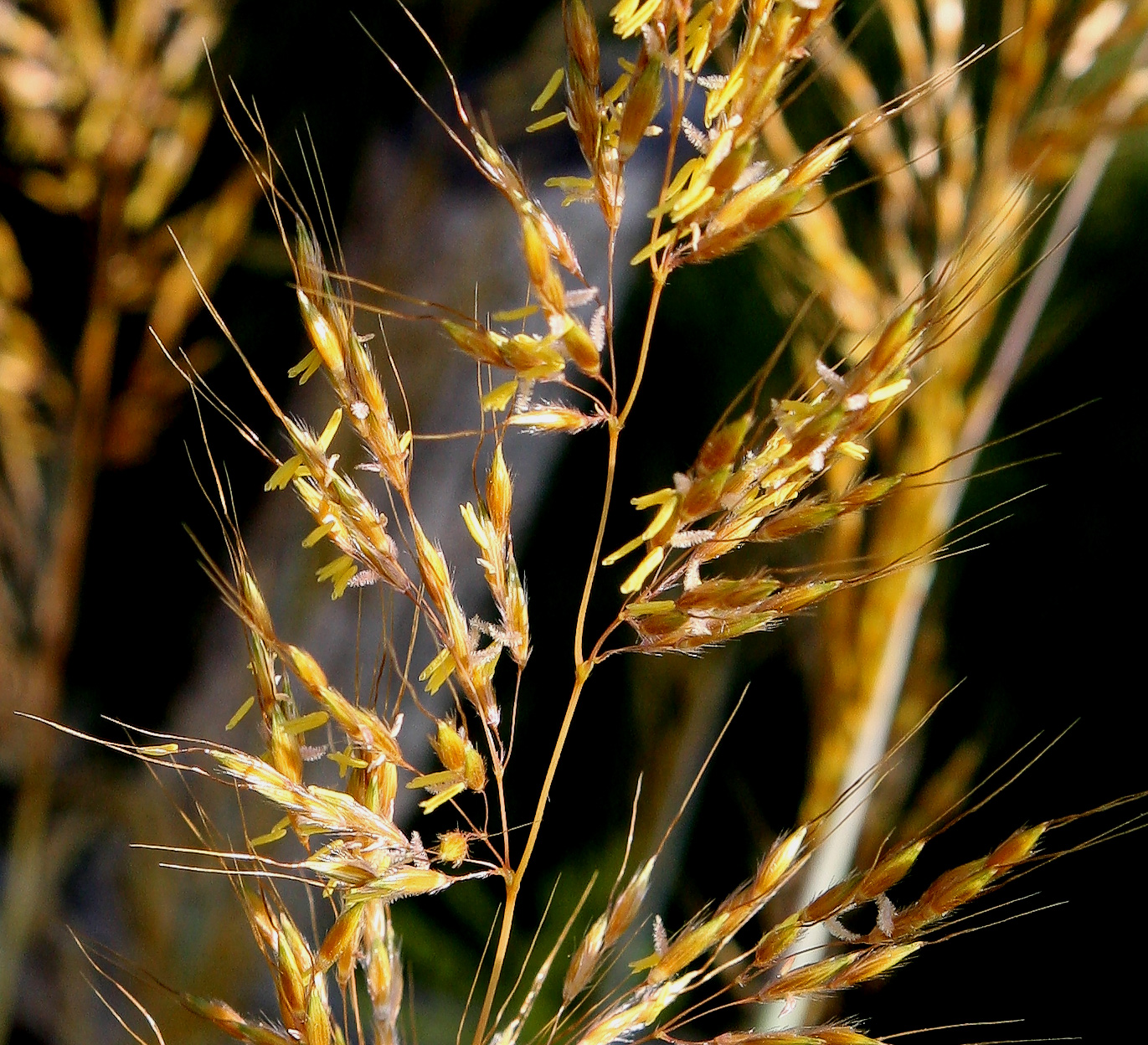
The architecture of the inflorescence in grasses is subject to the physical pressures of wind and shaped by the forces of natural selection facilitating wind-pollination (anemophily).

Turbulent forces in air and water affect the environment and ecosystem distribution, form, and dynamics. On a planetary scale, ecosystems are affected by circulation patterns in the global trade winds. Wind power and the turbulent forces it creates can influence heat, nutrient, and biochemical profiles of ecosystems. For example, wind running over the surface of a lake creates turbulence, mixing the water column and influencing the environmental profile to create thermally layered zones, affecting how fish, algae, and other parts of the aquatic ecosystem are structured.

Wind speed and turbulence influence evapotranspiration rates and energy budgets in plants and animals. Wind speed, temperature and moisture content vary as winds travel across different land features and elevations. For example, the westerlies come into contact with the coastal and interior mountains of western North America to produce a rain shadow on the leeward side of the mountain. The air expands and moisture condenses as the winds increase in elevation; this is called orographic lift and can cause precipitation. This environmental process produces spatial divisions in biodiversity, as species adapted to wetter conditions are range-restricted to the coastal mountain valleys and unable to migrate across the xeric ecosystems to intermix with sister lineages that are segregated to the interior mountain systems.

==== Fire ====
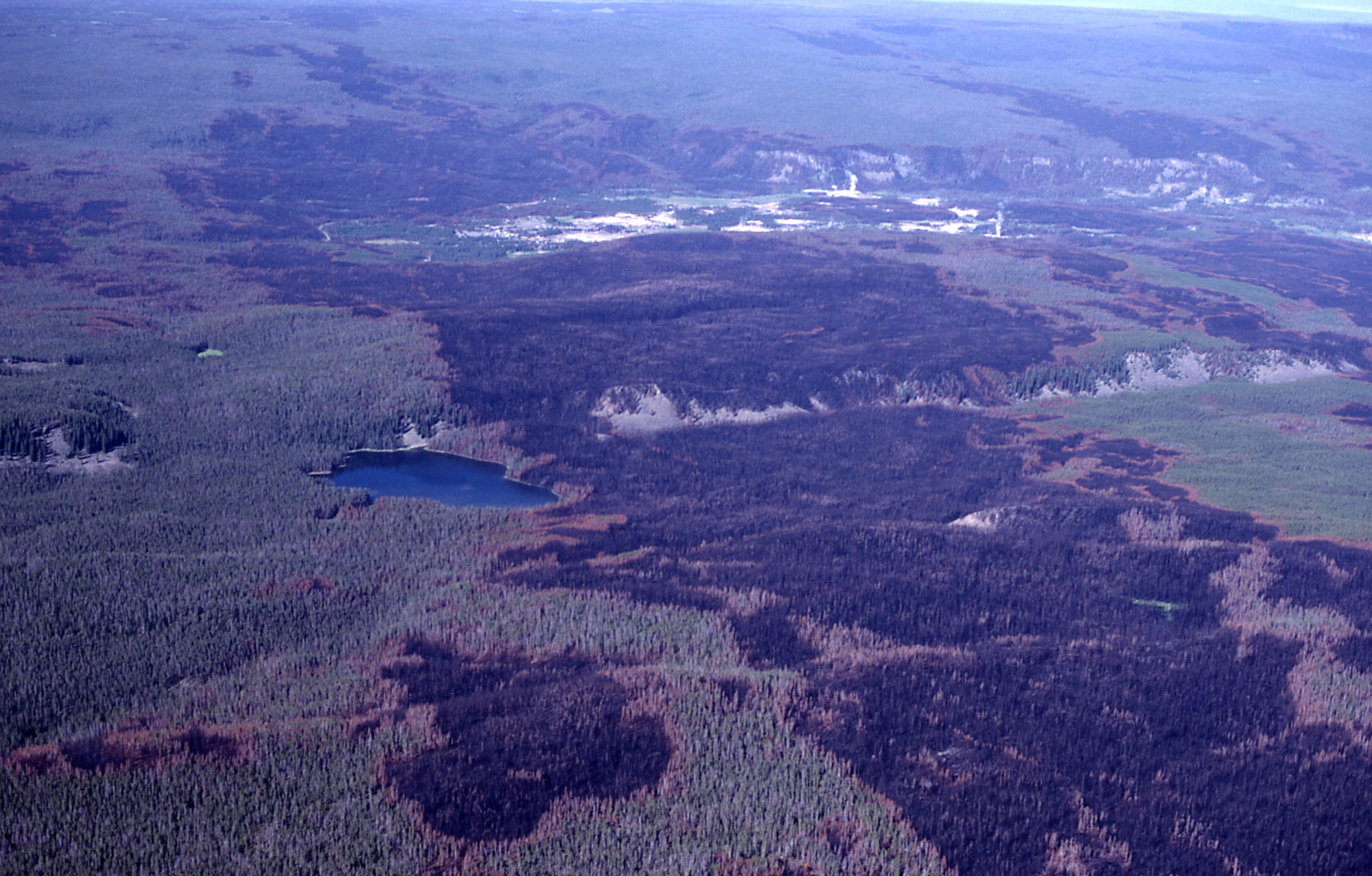
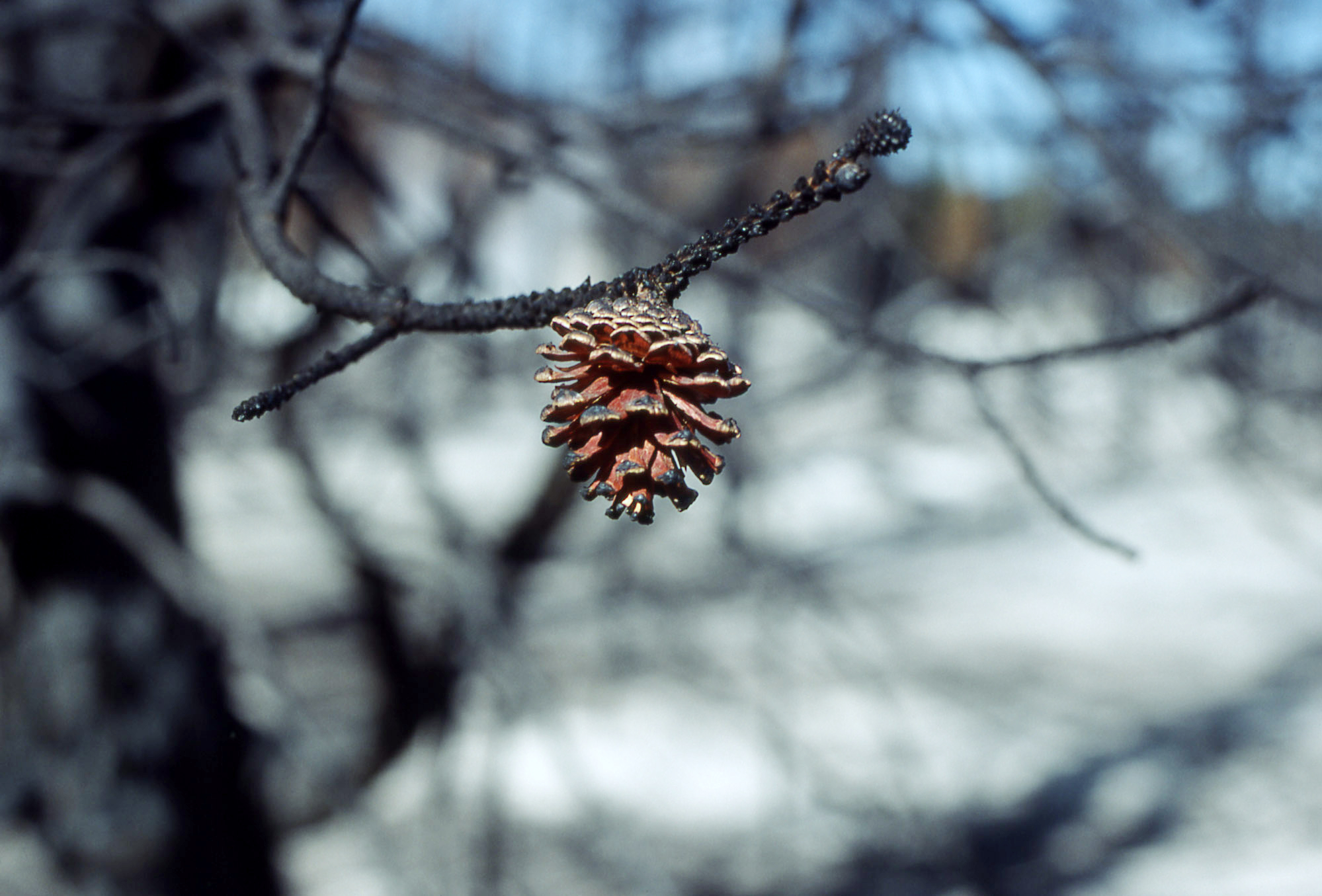
Forest fires modify the land by leaving behind an environmental mosaic that diversifies the landscape into different seral stages and habitats of varied quality (left). Some species are adapted to forest fires, such as pine trees that open their cones only after fire exposure (right).

Plants convert carbon dioxide into biomass and emit oxygen into the atmosphere. By approximately 350 million years ago (the end of the Devonian period), photosynthesis had brought the concentration of atmospheric oxygen above 17%, which allowed combustion to occur. Fire releases CO_{2} and converts fuel into ash and tar. Fire is a significant ecological parameter that raises many issues pertaining to its control and suppression. While the issue of fire in relation to ecology and plants has been recognized for a long time, Charles Cooper brought attention to the issue of forest fires in relation to the ecology of forest fire suppression and management in the 1960s.

==== Soils ====
Soil is the living top layer of mineral and organic dirt that covers the surface of the planet. It is the chief organizing centre of most ecosystem functions, and it is of critical importance in agricultural science and ecology. The decomposition of dead organic matter (for example, leaves on the forest floor), results in soils containing minerals and nutrients that feed into plant production. The whole of the planet's soil ecosystems is called the pedosphere where a large biomass of the Earth's biodiversity organizes into trophic levels. Invertebrates that feed and shred larger leaves, for example, create smaller bits for smaller organisms in the feeding chain. Collectively, these organisms are the detritivores that regulate soil formation. Soils form composite phenotypes where inorganic matter is enveloped into the physiology of a whole community. As organisms feed and migrate through soils they physically displace materials, an ecological process called bioturbation. This aerates soils and stimulates heterotrophic growth and production. Soil microorganisms are influenced by and are fed back into the trophic dynamics of the ecosystem.

==== Biogeochemistry and climate ====
Ecologists study nutrient budgets to understand how these materials are regulated, flow, and recycled through the environment. This research has led to an understanding that there is global feedback between ecosystems and the physical parameters of this planet, including minerals, soil, pH, ions, water, and atmospheric gases. Six major elements (hydrogen, carbon, nitrogen, oxygen, sulfur, and phosphorus; H, C, N, O, S, and P) form the constitution of all biological macromolecules and feed into the Earth's geochemical processes. From the smallest scale of biology, the combined effect of billions of ecological processes amplify and regulate the biogeochemical cycles of the Earth.

== History ==
=== Early beginnings ===
By ecology, we mean the whole science of the relations of the organism to the environment including, in the broad sense, all the "conditions of existence". Thus, the theory of evolution explains the housekeeping relations of organisms mechanistically as the necessary consequences of effectual causes; and so forms the monistic groundwork of ecology.

— Ernst Haeckel (1866)

Ecology has a complex origin. Ancient Greek philosophers such as Hippocrates and Aristotle recorded observations on natural history. However, they saw species as unchanging, while varieties were seen as aberrations. Modern ecology sees varieties as the real phenomena, leading to adaptation by natural selection. Ecological concepts such as a balance and regulation in nature can be traced to Herodotus (died c. 425 BC), who described mutualism in his observation of "natural dentistry". Basking Nile crocodiles, he noted, opened their mouths to give sandpipers safe access to pluck leeches out, giving nutrition to the sandpiper and oral hygiene for the crocodile. Aristotle and his student Theophrastus observed plant and animal migrations, biogeography, physiology, and their behavior, giving an early analogue to the concept of an ecological niche.

Nowhere can one see more clearly illustrated what may be called the sensibility of such an organic complex, – expressed by the fact that whatever affects any species belonging to it, must speedily have its influence of some sort upon the whole assemblage. He will thus be made to see the impossibility of studying any form completely, out of relation to the other forms, – the necessity for taking a comprehensive survey of the whole as a condition to a satisfactory understanding of any part.

— Stephen Forbes (1887)

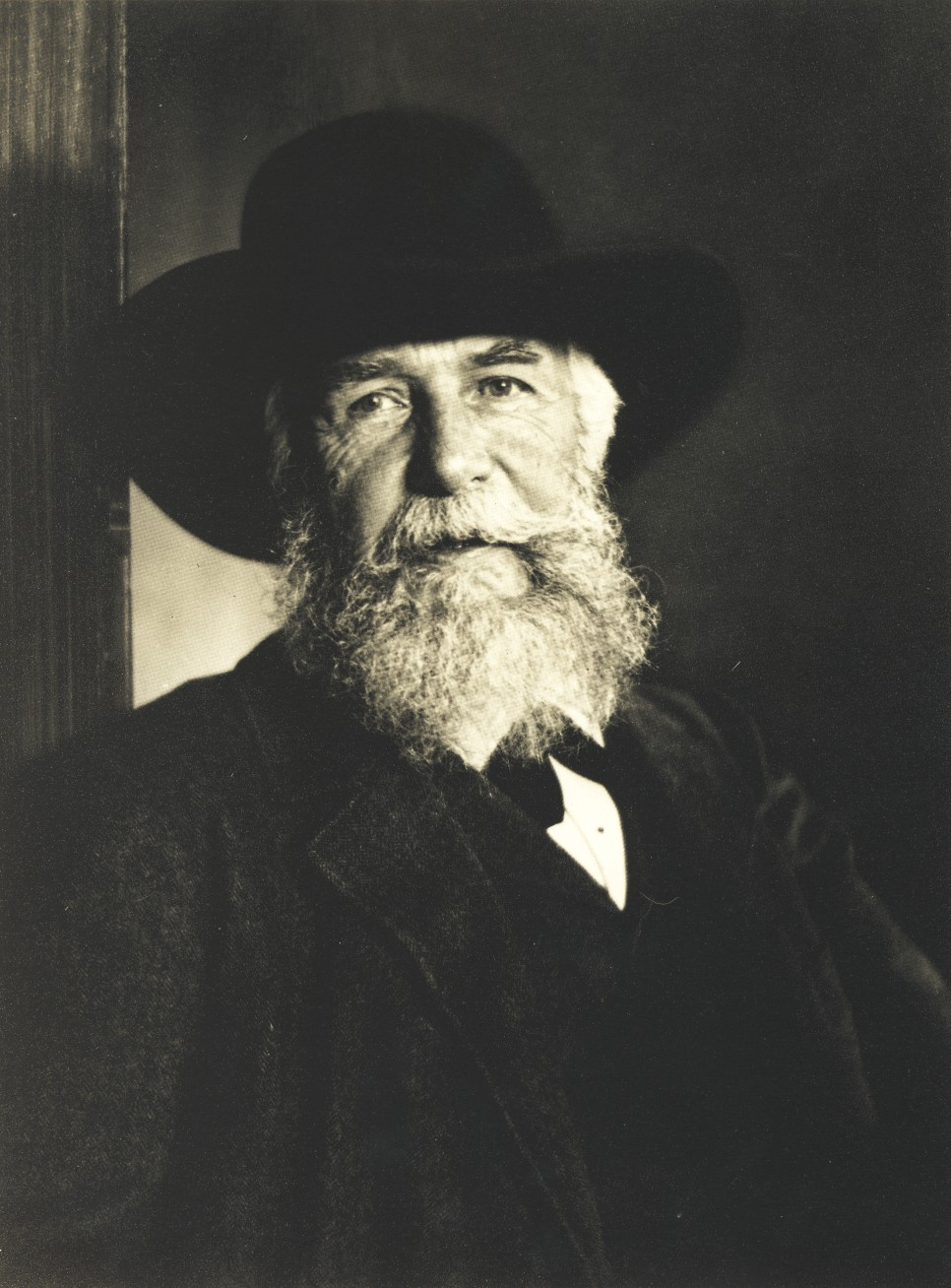
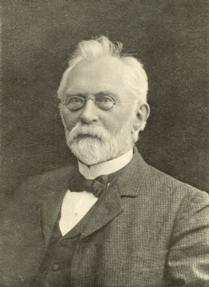

Ernst Haeckel (left) and Eugenius Warming (right), two founders of ecology

Ecological concepts such as food chains, population regulation, and productivity were developed in the 1700s, through the works of microscopist Antonie van Leeuwenhoek (1632–1723) and botanist Richard Bradley (1688?–1732). Biogeographer Alexander von Humboldt (1769–1859) recognized ecological gradients, where species are replaced or altered in form along environmental gradients. Humboldt drew inspiration from Isaac Newton, as he developed a form of "terrestrial physics". Natural historians, such as Humboldt, James Hutton, and Jean-Baptiste Lamarck laid the foundations of ecology. The term "ecology" (German: Oekologie, Ökologie) was coined by Ernst Haeckel in his book Generelle Morphologie der Organismen (1866). Haeckel was a zoologist, artist, writer, and later in life a professor of comparative anatomy.

Linnaeus founded an early branch of ecology that he called the economy of nature. He influenced Charles Darwin, who adopted Linnaeus' phrase in The Origin of Species. Linnaeus was the first to frame the balance of nature as a testable hypothesis.

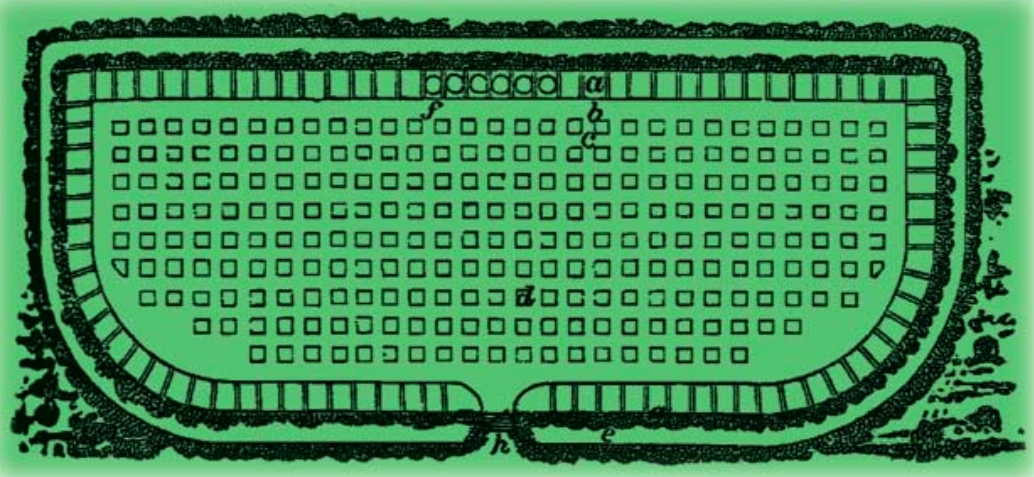
The layout of the first ecological experiment, carried out in a grass garden at Woburn Abbey in 1816, was noted by Charles Darwin in The Origin of Species. The experiment studied the performance of different mixtures of species planted in different kinds of soils.

=== Since 1900 ===
Modern ecology first attracted substantial scientific attention toward the end of the 19th century. Ellen Swallow Richards adopted the term "oekology" in the U.S. as early as 1892. In the early 20th century, ecology transitioned from description to a more analytical form of scientific natural history. Frederic Clements published the first American ecology book, Research Methods in Ecology in 1905, presenting the idea of plant communities as a superorganism. This launched a debate between ecological holism and individualism that lasted until the 1970s.

In 1942, Raymond Lindeman wrote a landmark paper on the trophic dynamics of ecology. Trophic dynamics became the foundation for much work on energy and material flow through ecosystems. Robert MacArthur advanced mathematical theory, predictions, and tests in ecology in the 1950s.

This whole chain of poisoning, then, seems to rest on a base of minute plants which must have been the original concentrators. But what of the opposite end of the food chain—the human being who, in probable ignorance of all this sequence of events, has rigged his fishing tackle, caught a string of fish from the waters of Clear Lake, and taken them home to fry for his supper?

— Rachel Carson (1962)

Ecology surged in popular and scientific interest during the 1960–1970s environmental movement. In 1962, marine biologist and ecologist Rachel Carson's book Silent Spring helped to mobilize the environmental movement by alerting the public to toxic pesticides, such as DDT (C_{14}H_{9}Cl_{5}), bioaccumulating in the environment. Since then, ecologists have worked to bridge their understanding of the degradation of the planet's ecosystems with environmental politics, law, restoration, and natural resources management.

== See also ==
- Carrying capacity
- Ecological death
- Ecological overshoot
- Ecological psychology
- Ecology movement
- Ecopsychology
- Natural resource
- Philosophy of ecology
- Sustainable development

Lists

- Glossary of ecology
- List of ecologists
- Terminology of ecology

== Notes ==
1. In Ernst Haeckel's (1866) footnote where the term ecology originates, he also gives attribute to Ancient Greek: χώρας, romanized: khōrā, lit. 'χωρα', meaning "dwelling place, distributional area" —quoted from Stauffer (1957).
2. This is a copy of Haeckel's original definition (Original: Haeckel, E. (1866) Generelle Morphologie der Organismen. Allgemeine Grundzige der organischen Formen- Wissenschaft, mechanisch begriindet durch die von Charles Darwin reformirte Descendenz-Theorie. 2 vols. Reimer, Berlin.) translated and quoted from Stauffer (1957).
3. Foster & Clark (2008) note how Smut's holism contrasts starkly against his racial political views as the father of apartheid.
4. First introduced in MacArthur & Wilson's (1967) book of notable mention in the history and theoretical science of ecology, The Theory of Island Biogeography.
5. Aristotle wrote about this concept in Metaphysics (Quoted from The Internet Classics Archive translation by W. D. Ross. Book VIII, Part 6): "To return to the difficulty which has been stated with respect both to definitions and to numbers, what is the cause of their unity? In the case of all things which have several parts and in which the totality is not, as it were, a mere heap, but the whole is something besides the parts, there is a cause; for even in bodies contact is the cause of unity in some cases and in others viscosity or some other such quality."
