= Chuck Cooper =

Chuck Cooper may refer to:

- Chuck Cooper (actor) (born 1954), American actor
- Chuck Cooper (basketball) (1926–1984), American basketball player

== See also ==
- Charles Cooper (disambiguation)
