= Ernest Simpson (cricketer) =

English cricketer

Personal information
- Full name: Ernest Herbert Simpson
- Born: 17 December 1875; Clapton, London, England
- Died: 2 October 1917 (aged 41); St. Omer, France
- Batting: Right-handed
- Role: Batsman
- Relatives: Charles Cooper (brother-in-law)

Domestic team information
- Years: Team
- 1896: Kent
- FC debut: 18 May 1896 Kent v Gloucestershire
- Last FC: 18 June 1896 Kent v Sussex

Career statistics
Competition	First-class
Matches	7
Runs scored	219
Batting average	15.64
100s/50s	0/1
Top score	94
Catches/stumpings	1/–
- Source: CricInfo, 6 June 2022

Ernest Herbert Simpson (17 December 1875 – 2 October 1917) was an English stockbroker who played first-class cricket during 1896. He died in France whilst serving during World War I.

== Early life ==
Simpson was born at Clapton, London in 1875, the second son of Frederick and Rose Simpson (née Jack); Simpson also had four sisters. The family lived at Beckenham in Kent, and Simpson's father worked at the London Stock Exchange, a profession which both boys later took up. Simpson was educated at boarding school at Littlehampton before moving to Malvern College in 1891, aged 15, where he played association football and, for three years, cricket. His obituary in The Malvernian described him as "strongly-built, full of keenness and vigour" and that he "threw himself whole-heartedly ... into every kind of game and athletics".

He captained the college cricket team, which Wisden described as a "thoroughly useful team", in his final year at school, succeeding Cuthbert Burnup in the role. He was a member of the Cadet Corps, leaving school in 1895 with the rank of lieutenant. He went up to Cambridge University for a period, but does not appear to have graduated. (Note: The Times of 26 May 1896 described Simpson as "the Cambridge freshman".)

== Cricket ==
As a school cricketer, Simpson was described by James Lillywhite's Cricketers' Annual as "a batsman of the stone-wall type with a rather clumsy style" although "a good field" in 1894. By the following year the same publication said that he had "shown great defensive powers" and praised his captaincy: "He knows the game and has proved an excellent captain". He made his first-class debut for Kent in the opening match of the 1896 season, playing against Gloucestershire at Gravesend. Burnup made his Kent debut in the same match and Simpson played alongside Charles Cooper who went on to marry one of his sisters in 1905.

A week later Simpson scored 94 runs against Lancashire at Old Trafford, his highest first-class score and the only time that he passed 50 runs for Kent. The Times reported that after an uncertain start that he "timed the ball well and got his runs in a bright and steady style". During the season he played in seven matches in the County Championship, all before the end of June, scoring a total of 219 runs at a batting average of 15.64 runs per innings. He played virtually no serious cricket after 1896, appearing occasionally for Malvern wanderers and Old Malvernians.

== Professional and family life ==
Simpson lived most of his life in Beckenham and joined the Stock Exchange in 1900. He dealt primarily in the US market and worked as a stock jobber. In April 1913 he married Violet Bishop in Sloane Square; the couple did not have children.

== Military service and death ==
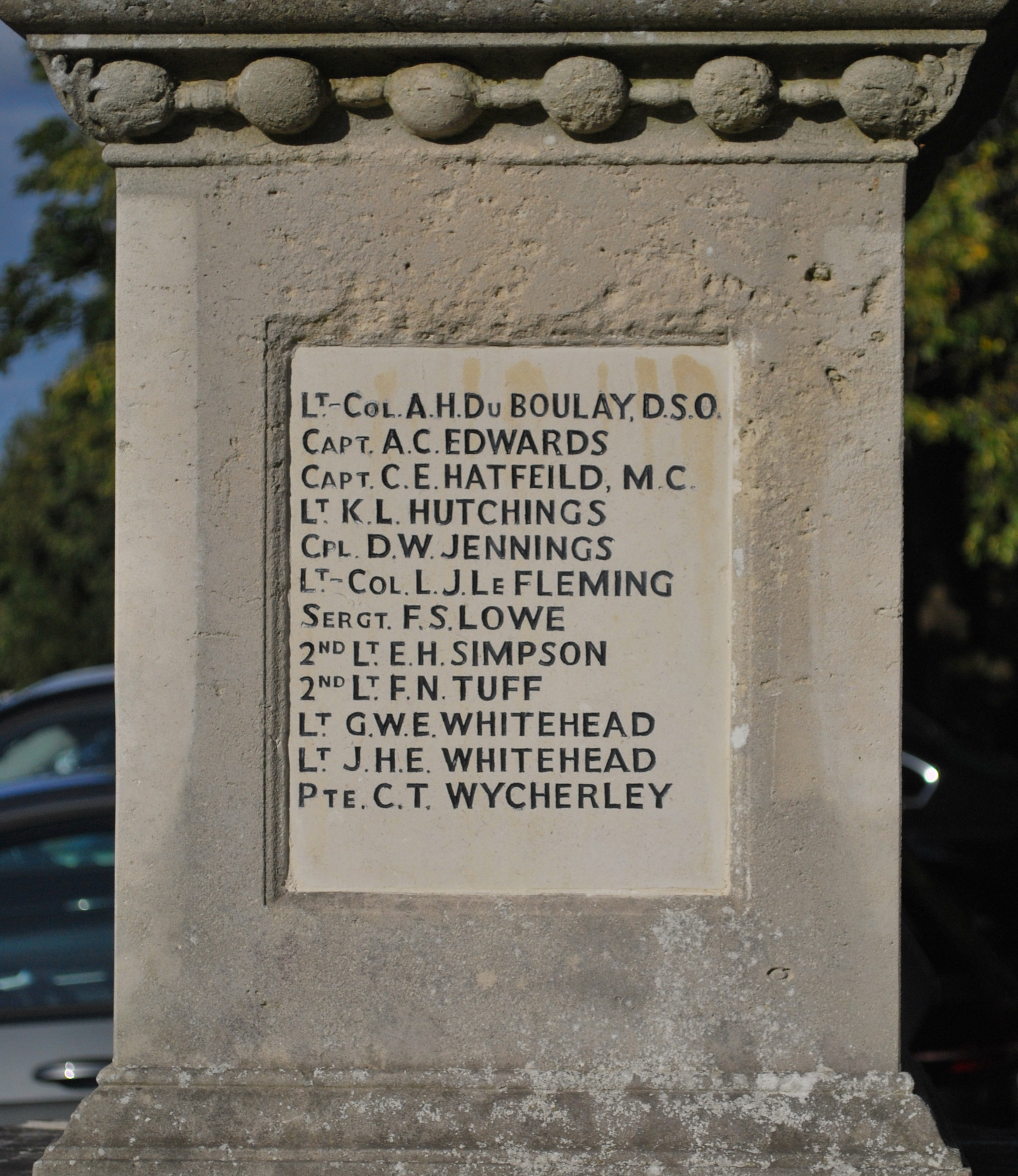
The Blythe memorial at the St Lawrence Ground, Canterbury showing the corrected inscription in 2019

At the beginning of World War I Simpson was too old to be considered for military service. With the reductions in the age limit and the likelihood of the introduction of conscription during 1915, Simpson enlisted under the Derby Scheme in December 1915 just before his 40th birthday. He became a private in the Army Reserve and returned home. In May 1916 he applied to join an Officer Cadet Unit and in June was appointed as a cadet to B Reserve Brigade of the Royal Horse Artillery, training to become an officer in an anti-aircraft unit. Later in the year he was commissioned as a second lieutenant in the Royal Garrison Artillery.

In October 1916 he left for France with the 201 Anti-Aircraft section and during December transferred to 29 AA Section on active service. In August 1917 he transferred again, this time to G Battery, attached to the ANZAC Corps and part of Second Army. The battery was stationed at Vlamertinge close to the Ypres Salient during the Battle of Passchendaele. On 27 September he was wounded in the back during a German bombing raid and was evacuated to hospital at St. Omer where he died on 2 October.

Simpson is buried at Longuenesse Souvenir Cemetery; he died aged 41. His name appears on the Blythe Memorial at Kent's St Lawrence Ground, although it was not initially engraved on the memorial, either due to an oversight or perhaps because he was attached to an ANZAC unit at the time of his death. His name was originally added out of alphabetical order to the memorial. When it was rededicated in 2019 the inscriptions were corrected and Simpson's name now appears in order on the restored memorial. His name also appears on the Malvern College war memorial, the London Stock Exchange war memorial, the MCC members war memorial at Lord's and on the Australian War Memorial Commemorative Roll.

== Bibliography ==
- Carlaw, Derek (2020). Kent County Cricketers, A to Z: Part One (1806–1914) (PDF). Cardiff: ACS.
- Lewis, Paul (2014). For Kent and Country. Eastbourne: Reveille Press. ISBN 978-19-08336-63-7.
- Renshaw, Andrew (2014). Wisden on the Great War. London: Bloomsbury. ISBN 978-1-408832-36-3
