= Charles F. Cooper (ecologist) =

American born ecologist (1924–1994)

- Born: 1924; Kenosha, Wisconsin, U.S.
- Died: 1994 (aged 69–70)
- Education: Duke University
- Known for: Use of fire in ecosystem management
- Awards: Fulbright fellowship
- Scientific career
- Fields: ecology
- Workplaces: San Diego State University
- Doctoral advisor: Professor H. J. Oosting

Charles F. Cooper (1924–1994) was an American born ecologist known for his studies of fire ecology and ecosystem management.

== Publications ==
- Cooper, C. F. 1960. Changes in Vegetation, Structure, and Growth of Southwestern Pine Forests since White Settlement. Ecological Monographs 30:129–164. doi:10.2307/1948549
- Cooper, C. F. 1961. Pattern in Ponderosa Pine Forests. Ecology 42:493–499
- Cooper, C. F. 1961. The ecology of fires. WH Freeman.
- Cooper, C. F. 1962. Water, in Agriculture and Arid Environments. Ecology 43:175–176. doi:10.2307/1932065
- Cooper, C. F. 1962. Grazing Practice on Public Lands. Ecology 43:354–355. doi:10.2307/1932009
- Cooper, C. F. 1963. An Evaluation of Variable Plot Sampling in Shrub and Herbaceous Vegetation. Ecology 44:565–569. doi:10.2307/1932536
- Cooper, C. F. 1965. Forest Fires and Forest Administration. Ecology 46:221–222. doi:10.2307/1935292
- Cooper, C. F., & W. C. Jolly 1970. Ecological effects of silver iodide and other weather modification agents: A review, Water Resour. Res., 6(1), 88–98, doi:10.1029/WR006i001p00088.
- Cooper, C. F. 1973. Tropical Life Zones. Ecology 54:956–957. doi:10.2307/1935695
- Cooper, C. F. 1977. Energy Paths: Soft and Hard. Ecology 58:1402–1403. doi:10.2307/1935095
- Cooper, C. F. 1981. A New Series in Applied Ecology. Ecology 62:1696–1696. doi:10.2307/1941536
- Cooper, C. F. 1983. Carbon storage in managed forests. Can. J. For. Res. 13(1): 155–166
- Cooper, C. F. 1985. Ecological Impact Assessment. Ecology 66:1986–1986. doi:10.2307/2937397
- Cooper, C. F. 1986. Students' Reaction. Ecology 67:583–583. doi:10.2307/1938603
- Cooper, C. F., Gale, J., LaMarche, V. C., Graybill, D. A., Fritts, H. C. & Rose, M. R. 1986. Carbon Dioxide Enhancement of Tree Growth at High Elevations. Science 231(4740): 859-860
