= Ecological death =

Ecological death is the inability of an organism to function in an ecological context, leading to death. This term can be used in many fields of biology to describe any species. In the context of aquatic toxicology, a toxic chemical, or toxicant, directly affects an aquatic organism but does not immediately kill it; instead it impairs an organism's normal ecological functions which then lead to death or lack of offspring. The toxicant makes the organism unable to function ecologically in some way, even though it does not suffer obviously from the toxicant. Ecological death may be caused by sublethal toxicological effects that can be behavioral, physiological, biochemical, or histological.

== Types of sublethal effects causing ecological death ==
Sublethal effects consist of any effects of an organism caused by a toxicant that do not include death. These effects are generally not observed well in a shorter acute toxicity test. A longer, chronic toxicity test will allow enough time for these effects to appear in an organism and for them to lead to ecological death.

=== Behavioral effects ===
Toxicants can affect an organism's behavior, which with aquatic organisms, may impact their ability to swim, feed or avoid predators. The impacted behavior can lead to an organism's death because it may starve or get eaten by predators. Toxicants may affect behavior by impacting the sensory systems which organisms depend on to collect information about their environment or by impacting an organism's motivation to properly respond to sensory cues. If an organism is unable to use sensory cues effectively, they may be unable to respond to early warning signs of predation risk. Toxicants can also affect later stages of predation by impacting an organism's ability to respond to predators or follow through with escape strategies.

=== Physiological effects ===
Toxicants can affect an organism's physiology which may impact its growth, reproduction, and/or development. If an organism does not grow correctly and is undersize or has growth defects, it will be more likely to be eaten by predators. If an organism's reproduction is impaired, it may not directly die, but it will be unable to pass on its genes to the population. The organism will no longer be representative in the population's gene pool.

=== Biochemical effects ===
Toxicants can alter the enzymes or ions present in an organism. If this alteration does not directly cause death, but impacts the behavior or physiology of the organism, it can also lead to ecological death.

=== Histological effects ===
Toxicants can alter an organism's tissues. If this alteration does not directly cause death, but impacts the behavior or physiology of the organism, it can also lead to ecological death.

== Toxicant examples leading to ecological death ==
=== DDT ===
An effect caused by DDT is shell thinning in bird eggs, leading to the death of the chick. Once DDT has been accumulated by an adult bird, it is metabolized into the form DDE which is both stable and toxic. Once in the form of DDE, the chemical impacts the metabolism of calcium in adult female birds’ shell glands, ultimately causing a decrease in eggshell thickness. At high concentrations of DDT, the eggshells will no longer be able to support the incubating parents’ weight and will lead to the death of the unborn chick. This is an example of physiological and biochemical sublethal effects leading to ecological death of the chick.

=== Diazinon ===
An effect caused by diazinon is a decrease in response to predator cues in Chinook salmon (Oncorhynchus tshawytscha). Diazinon, an organopesticide, was exposed to juvenile Chinook salmon for two hours at 1 and 10 μg/L, and these concentrations were enough to eliminate the behavioral responses of the fish to predator chemical cues. If the fish cannot recognize that a predator is nearby, it is likely to be eaten. This is an example of a behavioral sublethal effect leading to ecological death.

=== Pentachlorophenol ===
An effect caused by pentachlorophenol is a decrease in response to predator attacks in guppies (Poecilia reticula). Pentachlorophenol was exposed to juvenile guppies at 500 and 700 μg/L, and both concentrations decreased the guppies’ reactions to predators. The predators did not have to strike as frequently, did not have to pursue as frequently, or have to pursue the guppies as long as guppies that had not been exposed to these levels of pentachlorophenol. The guppies that were exposed to this chemical were more likely to be eaten due to their slower responses. This is another example of a behavioral sublethal effect that leads to ecological death.

=== Copper ===
An effect caused by copper is impacting the salmon olfactory system. The olfactory system is used to gather important information about one's environment. In the case of salmon, olfactory cues can gather information about habitat quality, predators, mates and more. Salmon can detect distinct copper gradients using their olfactory system, and use this information to avoid contaminated waters. However, when salmon are affected by copper, the olfactory system can be impacted in a matter of minutes. If the fish is no longer able to gather environmental information, it may be at risk for predation or unable to find resources for survival. This is an example of a physiological sublethal effect leading to ecological death.

== See also ==
- Water pollution
- Contamination
- Death
