= Charles Cooper (cricketer) =

English cricketer

Charles Osborn Cooper (5 August 1868 – 23 November 1943) was an English amateur cricketer who played for Kent County Cricket Club at the end of the 19th century.

Cooper was born at Plaistow in what was then Essex in 1868, the son of the owner of a wool warehouse. The family moved to Beckenham in Kent during the 1880s and Cooper attended Dulwich College where he played in the Cricket XI in 1885 and 1886. He appeared for the Gentlemen of Kent in 1892 before making his first-class cricket debut for Kent against Somerset in 1894 at Taunton. Cooper played in 10 matches for the county between 1894 and 1896.

Wisden described Cooper as "a steady bat, medium-paced bowler, and good slip fieldsman" in his obituary. He played club cricket for Beckenham Cricket Club, enjoying success with the bat into the 1900s. He married Maud Simpson, the sister of Kent cricketer Ernest Simpson, in 1905; the couple had two children. Professionally, Cooper was a leading supplier of artist's materials, having trained as a painter himself. He died at Southborough, Kent in 1943 aged 75.

== Bibliography ==
- Carlaw, Derek (2020). Kent County Cricketers, A to Z: Part One (1806–1914) (PDF). Cardiff: ACS.
