= Billy Idol discography =

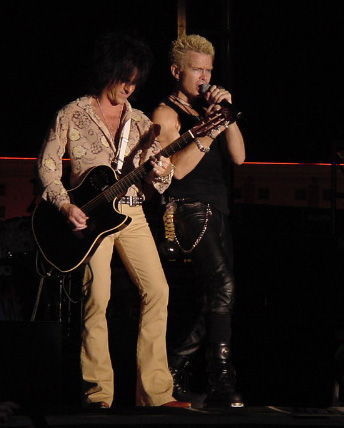
- Billy Idol (right) and Steve Stevens, 2003
- Studio albums: 9
- Extended plays: 3
- Live albums: 2
- Compilation albums: 7
- Singles: 38
- Video albums: 7
- Music videos: 29

Billy Idol is an English rock singer who has sold 40 million records worldwide. His solo recordings post-Generation X consist of seven studio albums, one live album, seven compilation albums, three extended plays, and 37 singles. In 1982 Idol released his eponymous debut studio album. The album debuted at number 45 on the Billboard 200 and number 5 in New Zealand. The album has since been certified platinum by the Music Canada and RMNZ. He followed this up with Rebel Yell in 1983, the album quickly became a commercial success peaking at number 6 on the Billboard 200 and number 2 in both Germany and New Zealand. This album produced the two hit singles one being the title track "Rebel Yell" and the other "Eyes Without a Face" which reached number 4 on the Billboard Hot 100. "Rebel Yell" also garnered Idol his first Grammy nomination for Best Male Rock Vocal Performance at the 27th Annual Grammy Awards. The album has since been certified platinum by the RIAA, RMNZ, Music Canada and Pro-Música Brasil.

Idols third studio album Whiplash Smile became an even bigger commercial success then its predecessor, charting at number 3 in Finland, number 4 in both Sweden and Switzerland, along with charting in the top 10 in 7 other countries. His single "To Be a Lover" peaked at number 6 on the Billboard Hot 100, number 3 in both Australia and Finland and number 2 in the New Zealand. The song also garnered him another nomination for Best Male Rock Vocal Performance at the 29th Annual Grammy Awards. The album has since been certified platinum in the US, Canada and New Zealand.

A remix album was released in 1987, titled Vital Idol. The album featured a live rendition of his cover of Tommy James' "Mony Mony". In 1987, the single topped the United States chart and reached number 7 in the UK. The following year in 1988 a compilation album titled Idol Songs: 11 of the Best was released, it charted at number 2 in both the UK and Iceland along with reaching number 1 in Finland. It has since gone platinum multiple countries.

In 1990 Idol released his fourth studio album Charmed Life it charted in the top ten in 7 countries along with peaking at number 4 in Switzerland, 3 in New Zealand along with topping the charts in Finland. It produced the single "Cradle of Love" which peaked at number 2 on the Billboard Hot 100 along with topping the US Mainstream Rock Charts. The single also earned Idol a third Grammy nomination for Best Male Rock Vocal Performance at the 33rd Annual Grammy Awards. The album has since been certified gold by the RIAA and Canada Music.

In 1993 he released his fifth studio album Cyberpunk achieving moderate chart success peaking within the top 20 in 7 countries, along with getting into the top 10 in Austria and Finland. In 2002 he released a semi-acoustic live album titled VH1 Storytellers. Then following a 12 year hiatus Idol released Devil's Playground in 2005 the album reached No. 46 on the Billboard 200 and charted the highest in Germany at number 15. The following year he released a Christmas album titled Happy Holidays.

Following another hiatus of 8 years, Idol released Kings & Queens of the Underground which debuted at number 34 on the Billboard 200, along with charting a number 10 in Switzerland and 8 in Germany. Then following another 11 years in between albums Idol released his 9th and most recent album Dream into it 2025. The album charted in the top 5 in both Switzerland and Austria with its highest placement peaking a number 2 in Germany.

== Albums ==
=== Studio albums ===
Title	Album details	Peak chart positions										Certifications (sales thresholds)
Title	Album details	UK	AUS	AUT	FIN	GER	NZ	NOR	SWE	SWI	US	Certifications (sales thresholds)
Billy Idol	Released: 16 July 1982; Label: Chrysalis; Format: LP, CD, CC, 8-track	—	66	—	—	—	5	—	49	—	45	MC: Platinum; RIAA: Gold
Rebel Yell	Released: 10 November 1983; Label: Chrysalis; Format: LP, CD, CC, 8-track	36	16	—	—	2	2	—	—	16	6	BPI: Silver; MC: 5× Platinum; RIAA: 2× Platinum
Whiplash Smile	Released: 20 October 1986; Label: Chrysalis; Format: LP, CD, CC, 8-track	8	6	18	3	9	5	12	4	4	6	BPI: Gold; IFPI FIN: Gold; MC: 3× Platinum; RIAA: Platinum
Charmed Life	Released: 30 April 1990; Label: Chrysalis; Format: LP, CD, CC	15	11	11	1	5	3	5	6	4	11	BPI: Silver; ARIA: Gold; MC: Platinum; RIAA: Platinum
Cyberpunk	Released: 28 June 1993; Label: Chrysalis; Format: LP, CD, CC	20	12	5	6	13	—	19	11	15	48	
Devil's Playground	Released: 22 March 2005; Label: Sanctuary; Format: CD	78	—	34	—	15	—	—	40	32	46	
Happy Holidays	Released: October 2006; Label: Bodog Music; Format: CD	—	—	—	—	—	—	—	—	—	—	
Kings & Queens of the Underground	Released: 17 October 2014; Label: BFI; Format: LP, CD	35	81	17	—	8	—	—	—	10	34	
Dream Into It	Released: 25 April 2025; Label: Dark Horse; Formats: CD, digital download, LP, streaming	79	—	5	—	2	—	—	—	3	—	
"—" denotes the album failed to chart or was not released.

=== Live albums ===
Title	Album details	Peak chart positions	
Title	Album details	GER	SWI
VH1 Storytellers	Released: February, 2002; Label: Capitol; Format: CD	14	76
BFI Live!	Released: 25 November 2016; Label: BFI; Format: LP (Record Store Day exclusive)	—	—
"—" denotes the album failed to chart or was not released.

=== Compilation albums ===
Title	Album details	Peak chart positions										Certifications (sales thresholds)
Title	Album details	UK	AUS	AUT	FIN	GER	NZ	NOR	SWE	SWI	US	Certifications (sales thresholds)
Vital Idol (1985 International Version)	Released: 30 May 1985 (UK); Label: Chrysalis; Format: LP, CD, CC, 8 Track	7	38	—	17	8	8	—	19	24	—	BPI: Platinum
Vital Idol (1987 New US Edition)	Released: 16 September 1987 (US); Label: Chrysalis; Format: LP, CD, CC	41	12	—	—	—	14	—	—	—	10	MC: 4× Platinum; RIAA: Platinum
Idol Songs: 11 of the Best	Released: 20 June 1988; Label: Chrysalis; Format: LP, CD, CC	2	11	11	1	14	—	4	4	6	—	BPI: Platinum; ARIA: Platinum; IFPI FIN: Platinum
Greatest Hits	Released: March 2001; Label: Capitol; Format: CD, CC	171	—	43	2	12	3	4	12	30	74	BPI: Gold; IFPI FIN: Gold; RIAA: Platinum; RMNZ: Gold
The Very Best of Billy Idol: Idolize Yourself	Released: June 2008; Label: Capitol; Format: CD + DVD	37	—	—	—	38	39	—	—	72	77	RMNZ: Platinum
Icon	Released: April 2013; Label: Capitol; Format: CD, LP, digital download	—	—	—	—	—	—	—	—	—	—	
Vital Idol: Revitalized	Released: September 2018; Label: Capitol; Format: LP, CD	—	—	—	—	—	—	—	—	—	—	
"—" denotes the album failed to chart or was not released.

== Extended plays ==
Title	Details	Peak chart positions
Title	Details	US
Don't Stop	Released: October 1981; Label: Chrysalis; Format: 12", CD	71
The Roadside	Released: 17 September 2021; Label: Dark Horse; Format: CD and vinyl	176
The Cage	Released: 23 September 2022; Label: Dark Horse; Format: CD and vinyl	—

- ^{+} Greatest Hits and Devil's Playground failed to chart in The Official UK Top 75 Albums Chart (published by Music Week), but did chart on the complete Top 200 UK Chart published by Charts+Plus (published mainly for music business statistics).

== Singles ==
Starting with the 1983 re-release of "White Wedding", Chrysalis issued Idol's singles with an "Idol" vanity catalogue numbering system, which lasted for roughly seven years and sixteen singles (including various re-issues) until the release of "Prodigal Blues" in 1990.

=== 1980s ===
Year	Title	Peak chart positions										Certifications	Album
Year	Title	UK	AUS	AUT	FIN	GER	NL	NZL	SWI	SWE	US	Certifications	Album
1981	"Dancing with Myself"	—	—	—	—	—	—	—	—	—	—	BPI: Silver; RMNZ: Platinum	Don't Stop
1981	"Mony Mony"	—	—	—	—	—	—	—	—	—	—	RMNZ: Gold	Don't Stop
1982	"Hot in the City"	58	18	5	—	—	—	5	—	—	23	RMNZ: Gold	Billy Idol
1982	"White Wedding"	—	9	—	—	—	—	5	—	—	36		Billy Idol
1983	"Dancing with Myself" (re-release)	—	42	—	—	—	—	9	—	—	—		Don't Stop
1984	"Rebel Yell"	62	7	—	—	—	—	3	—	—	46		Rebel Yell
1984	"Eyes Without a Face"	18	12	—	—	10	13	4	21	—	4	BPI: Platinum; RMNZ: 2× Platinum	Rebel Yell
1984	"Flesh for Fantasy"	54	28	—	—	11	—	5	20	—	29		Rebel Yell
1984	"Catch My Fall"	—	61	—	—	11	—	42	—	—	50		Rebel Yell
1985	"White Wedding" (UK re-release)	6	—	—	—	—	—	—	—	—	—	BPI: Platinum; RMNZ: 2× Platinum	Vital Idol
1985	"Rebel Yell" (UK re-release)	6	—	—	—	—	—	—	—	—	—	BPI: Gold; RMNZ: 2× Platinum	Rebel Yell
1986	"To Be a Lover"	22	3	—	3	28	—	2	7	8	6		Whiplash Smile
1987	"Don't Need a Gun"	26	22	—	8	36	—	27	29	—	37		Whiplash Smile
1987	"Sweet Sixteen"	17	9	5	16	2	11	3	12	—	20		Whiplash Smile
1987	"Soul Standing By" (Aus & NZ only)	—	93	—	—	—	—	20	—	—	—		Whiplash Smile
1987	"Mony Mony" (Live)	7	8	—	4	38	89	2	13	—	1		Vital Idol / Idol Songs
1987	"Hot in the City" (remix)	13	58	—	3	6	40	19	19	—	48		Vital Idol / Idol Songs
1988	"Catch My Fall" (UK re-release)	63	—	—	—	—	—	—	—	—	—		Vital Idol / Idol Songs
"—" denotes the single failed to chart or was not released.

=== 1990s ===
Year	Title	Peak chart positions										Certifications	Album
Year	Title	UK	AUS	FIN	GER	NZL	SWI	SWE	US	US Alt	US Main.	Certifications	Album
1990	"Cradle of Love"	34	10	8	38	16	11	—	2	7	1	RIAA: Gold	Charmed Life
1990	"L.A. Woman"	70	34	—	—	25	—	—	52	—	18		Charmed Life
1990	"Prodigal Blues"	47	—	—	—	—	—	—	—	—	35		Charmed Life
1993	"Heroin"	—	—	—	—	—	—	—	—	—	—		Cyberpunk
1993	"Shock to the System"	30	28	—	—	5	37	25	105	23	7		Cyberpunk
1993	"Adam in Chains"	—	—	—	—	—	—	—	—	—	—		Cyberpunk
1994	"Speed"	47	33	—	—	40	—	39	—	—	38		Speed: Songs from and Inspired by the Motion Picture
"—" denotes the single failed to chart or was not released.

=== 2000s–2020s ===
Year	Title	Peak chart positions					Album
Year	Title	GER	US AAA	US Adult Pop	US Airplay	US Main.	Album
2001	"Don't You (Forget About Me)"	—	—	—	—	—	Greatest Hits
2005	"Scream"	54	—	—	—	26	Devil's Playground
2008	"John Wayne"	—	—	—	—	—	The Very Best of Billy Idol: Idolize Yourself
2014	"Can't Break Me Down"	—	15	—	—	—	Kings & Queens of the Underground
2021	"Bitter Taste"	—	15	—	45	—	The Roadside
2022	"Cage"	—	—	—	—	—	The Cage
2025	"Still Dancing"	—	—	—	—	—	Dream Into It
2025	"77" (featuring Avril Lavigne)	—	—	22	—	—	Dream Into It
"—" denotes the single failed to chart or was not released.

- ^{+} "Mony Mony" (1981 release), "Dancing with Myself" (1983 re-release), and "Shock to the System" did not chart on the Billboard Hot 100 but appeared on the Billboard Bubbling Under Hot 100 Singles chart.

=== Promotional singles ===
Year	Song	Album
1993	"Wasteland" (UK Jukebox 7" and US promo CD)	Cyberpunk
1993	"Aftershock" (Spanish promo 12")	Cyberpunk
2005	"Cherie" (EU and US promo CD)	Devil's Playground
2005	"Sherri" (German promo CD)	Devil's Playground
2005	"Rat Race" (US promo CD)	Devil's Playground
2005	"Plastic Jesus" (German promo CD)	Devil's Playground
2005	"Yellin' at the Xmas Tree" (EU and US promo CD)	Devil's Playground
2008	"New Future Weapon" (German promo CD)	The Very Best of Billy Idol: Idolize Yourself
2014	"Save Me Now"	Kings & Queens of the Underground

== Other appearances ==
Year	Song(s)	Album
1990	"Lovechild"	Nobody's Child: Romanian Angel Appeal
1994	"Cradle of Love" (Live)	Grammy's Greatest Moments Volume I by Various artists
2000	"Buried Alive"	Heavy Metal 2000 OST by Various artists
2000	"Into the Night"	Iommi by Tony Iommi
2006	"In the Summertime" (with Derek Sherinian & Slash)	Blood of the Snake by Derek Sherinian
2006	"Tomorrow Never Knows"	Butchering the Beatles - A Headbashing Tribute by Various artists
2006	"For What It's Worth" (Live) "Rebel Yell" (Live)	The Bridge School Collection, Vol. 1 by Various artists
2011	"Kiss Me Deadly" (Live) "Running With the Boss Sound" (Live)	The Bridge School Collection, Vol. 5 by Various artists
2020	"Night Crawling"	Plastic Hearts by Miley Cyrus

== Videography ==
=== Video albums ===
Year	Album	Peak chart positions		Certification
Year	Album	AUS DVD	HUN	Certification
1987	Vital Idol: Released: 1987; Label: Chrysalis Records; Format: LD, VHS	—	—	
1991	The Charmed Life and Other Vital Videos: Released: 1991; Label: Capitol Records; Format: VHS	—	—	
1993	Cyberpunk: Shock to the System: Released: 1993; Label: Chrysalis Records; Format: VHS	—	—	
2002	VH1 Storytellers: Released: 2002; Label: Warner Music Vision; Format: DVD, VHS	17	20	ARIA: Gold
2008	The Very Best of Billy Idol: Idolize Yourself (DVD part): Released: 2008; Label: Capitol Records; Format: DVD	—	—	
2009	In Super Overdrive Live: Released: 2009; Label: Eagle Rock Entertainment; Format: Blu-ray, DVD	—	—	
2011	No Religion Live: Released: 2011; Label: Hatch Farm Studios; Format: DVD	—	—	
"—" denotes the album failed to chart or was not released.

=== Music videos ===
Year	Title	Director
1982	"Hot in the City"^{a}	Larry Jordan
1982	"White Wedding"	David Mallet
1983	"Dancing with Myself"	Tobe Hooper
1984	"Rebel Yell"	Jeff Stein
1984	"Eyes Without a Face"	David Mallet
1984	"Flesh for Fantasy"	Howard Deutch
1985	"Catch My Fall"	David Mallet
1986	"To Be a Lover"	David Mallet
1987	"Don't Need a Gun"	Julien Temple
1987	"Sweet Sixteen"^{b}	Billy Idol
1987	"Mony Mony" (Live)	Larry Jordan
1990	"Cradle of Love"^{c}	David Fincher
1990	"L.A. Woman"	David Fincher
1990	"Prodigal Blues"	-
1993	"Heroin"^{d}	Brett Leonard
1993	"Shock to the System"^{e}	Brett Leonard
1993	"Adam in Chains"	Julien Temple
1994	"Speed"	-
2005	"Scream"	-
2005	"Plastic Jesus"	-
2005	"Yellin' at the Xmas Tree"	-
2006	"In the Summertime" (with Derek Sherinian & Slash)	-
2006	"Jingle Bell Rock"	-
2006	"Happy Holiday"	-
2006	"White Christmas"	-
2006	"Winter Wonderland"	-
2014	"Can't Break Me Down"	Jason Trucco
2015	"Save Me Now"	Tom Kirk
2021	"Bitter Taste"	Steven Sebring
2022	"Cage"	Steven Sebring
2022	"Running from the Ghost"	Spencer Ramsey
2025	"Still Dancing"	Steven Sebring

^a Versions of "Hot in the City":

1. Original Version
2. Uncensored Version
3. Ur-Version

^b Versions of "Sweet Sixteen":

1. Original Version
2. Colored Version

^c Versions of "Cradle of Love":

1. Original Version
2. Extended Billy Idol Only Version

^d Versions of "Heroin":

1. LP Version
2. Radio Edit
3. Uncut Version
4. Blendo Version
5. Overlords Version
6. Overlords-R rated Version
7. Garcia Mix
8. Garcia Mix-R rated

^e Versions of "Shock to the System":

1. Original Version
2. Blendo Version
