= Idol Songs: 11 of the Best =

Greatest hits album by Billy Idol
- Released: 20 June 1988
- Recorded: 1981–1987
- Genre: New wave
- Length: 43:49
- Label: Chrysalis
- Producer: Keith Forsey

Billy Idol chronology
Whiplash Smile (1986)	Idol Songs: 11 of the Best (1988)	Charmed Life (1990)

Professional ratings
Review scores
Source	Rating
AllMusic	4/5 stars
Kerrang!	4/5 stars
Record Mirror	4/5 stars

Idol Songs: 11 of the Best is a greatest hits album by the English rock singer Billy Idol, released on 20 June 1988 by Chrysalis Records. It comprises all the singles released from his first three studio albums—Billy Idol, Rebel Yell and Whiplash Smile—as well as the live version of "Mony Mony" and re-recorded Generation X song "Dancing with Myself", both of which appeared on Idol's debut EP Don't Stop. A limited edition of the album contains two extra remixes, and another limited edition contains four extra remixes. The album reached number two on the UK Albums Chart and has been certified platinum by the British Phonographic Industry (BPI). In 2003, the album was reissued with a different title and cover as The Essential.

== Track listings ==
Original LP
No.	Title	Writer(s)	Original album	Length
1.	"Rebel Yell"	Billy Idol; Steve Stevens	Rebel Yell (1983)	4:48
2.	"Hot in the City"	Idol	Billy Idol (1982)	3:38
3.	"White Wedding" (Part 1)	Idol	Billy Idol (1982)	3:34
4.	"Eyes Without a Face"	Idol; Stevens	Rebel Yell (1983)	4:10
5.	"Catch My Fall"	Idol	Rebel Yell (1983)	3:43
6.	"Mony Mony" (live)	Tommy James; Bo Gentry; Ritchie Cordell; Bobby Bloom	Don't Stop EP (1981)	4:10
7.	"To Be a Lover"	William Bell; Booker T. Jones	Whiplash Smile (1986)	3:52
8.	"Sweet Sixteen"	Idol	Whiplash Smile (1986)	4:15
9.	"Flesh for Fantasy"	Idol; Stevens	Rebel Yell (1983)	3:49
10.	"Don't Need a Gun"	Idol	Whiplash Smile (1986)	4:28
11.	"Dancing with Myself" (single version)	Idol; Tony James	Kiss Me Deadly (1981)	3:22
Total length:				43:49

Limited edition with two bonus tracks
No.	Title	Writer(s)	Original album	Length
12.	"Don't Need a Gun" (Meltdown Mix)	Idol	Whiplash Smile (1986)	7:08
13.	"To Be a Lover" (Mother of Mercy Mix)	Bell; Jones	Whiplash Smile (1986)	6:47
Total length:				57:42

Limited edition with four bonus tracks
No.	Title	Writer(s)	Original album	Length
12.	"Don't Need a Gun" (Melt Down Mix)	Idol	Whiplash Smile (1986)	7:08
13.	"Mony Mony" (Hung Like a Pony Mix)	James; Gentry; Cordell; Bloom	Don't Stop EP (1981)	7:02
14.	"Eyes Without a Face" (extended version)	Idol; Stevens	Flesh for Fantasy (1983)	4:58
15.	"To Be a Lover" (Mother of Mercy Mix)	Bell; Jones	Whiplash Smile (1986)	6:49
Total length:				69:46

Note: "Don't Need a Gun" (Melt Down Mix) was unavailable elsewhere on CD and remained exclusive to the limited edition versions. The "Mony Mony" (Hung Like a Pony Mix) was also available on the Japanese issue of the Vital Idol remix album. These two tracks have been available since 2012 on the So80s compilation.

== Personnel ==
- Kenny Aaronson – bass on "Mony Mony"
- Jocelyn Brown – backing vocals on "To Be a Lover"
- Sal Cuevas – bass on "Eyes Without a Face"
- Terry Chimes – drums on "Dancing with Myself"
- Susan Davis – keyboards on "Mony Mony"
- Judi Dozier – keyboards on "Rebel Yell", "Eyes Without a Face", "Catch My Fall" and "Flesh for Fantasy"
- Phil Feit – bass on "White Wedding"
- Harold Faltermeyer – keyboards on "Don't Need a Gun"
- Keith Forsey – drums on "Hot in the City" and "Sweet Sixteen"; Juno 60 on "To Be a Lover"; keyboards on "Sweet Sixteen"; drum programming on "Don't Need a Gun"
- Connie Harvey – backing vocals on "To Be a Lover"
- Billy Idol – vocals and guitars, bass on "To Be a Lover"
- Tony James – bass on "Dancing with Myself"
- Steve Jones – guitar on "Dancing with Myself"
- Michael Klvana – additional keyboards on "Mony Mony"
- Perri Lister – backing vocals on "Eyes Without a Face"
- Marcus Miller – bass on "Sweet Sixteen"
- Steve Missal – drums on "White Wedding"
- Steve New – guitar on "Dancing with Myself"
- Ainsley Otton – guitar on "Hot in the City"
- Thommy Price – drums on "Rebel Yell", "Eyes Without a Face", "Catch My Fall", "Mony Mony" and "Flesh for Fantasy"
- Mick Smiley – bass on "Hot in the City"
- Stephanie Sprull – backing vocals on "Hot in the City"
- Steve Stevens – guitar on all tracks except "Hot in the City" and "Dancing with Myself"; bass, Casio and keyboards on "Rebel Yell", "Eyes Without a Face", "Catch My Fall", "To Be a Lover" and "Flesh for Fantasy"; programming on "To Be a Lover"; bass on "Don't Need a Gun"
- Richard Tell – piano on "To Be a Lover"
- Steve Webster – bass on "Rebel Yell" and "Catch My Fall"
- Mars Williams – saxophone on "Catch My Fall"
- Janet Wright – backing vocals on "To Be a Lover"

== Charts ==
=== Weekly charts ===
Weekly chart performance for Idol Songs: 11 of the Best
Chart (1988)	Peak position
Australian Albums (ARIA)	11
Austrian Albums (Ö3 Austria)	11
European Albums (Music & Media)	6
Finnish Albums (Suomen virallinen lista)	1
German Albums (Offizielle Top 100)	14
Icelandic Albums (Tónlist)	2
Norwegian Albums (VG-lista)	4
Swedish Albums (Sverigetopplistan)	4
Swiss Albums (Schweizer Hitparade)	6
UK Albums (OCC)	2

=== Year-end charts ===
Year-end chart performance for Idol Songs: 11 of the Best
Chart (1988)	Position
European Albums (Music & Media)	42
UK Albums (Gallup)	28

== Certifications ==
Certifications for Idol Songs: 11 of the Best
Region	Certification	Certified units/sales
Australia (ARIA)	Platinum	70,000^{^}
Austria (IFPI Austria)	Gold	25,000^{*}
Finland (Musiikkituottajat)	Platinum	50,000
France (SNEP)	Gold	100,000^{*}
Sweden (GLF)	Gold	50,000^{^}
Switzerland (IFPI Switzerland)	Gold	25,000^{^}
United Kingdom (BPI)	Platinum	300,000^{^}
^{*} Sales figures based on certification alone.^{^} Shipments figures based on certification alone.
