= VH1 Storytellers (Billy Idol album) =

Live album by Billy Idol
- Released: 26 February 2002
- Recorded: 19 April 2001
- Genre: Rock
- Length: 69:47
- Label: Capitol

Billy Idol chronology
Greatest Hits (2001)	VH1 Storytellers (2002)	Devil's Playground (2005)

Professional ratings
Review scores
Source	Rating
Allmusic Link	3/5 stars

VH1 Storytellers is a semi-acoustic live album by the English rock singer Billy Idol, recorded at the VH1 Storytellers in 2001 and released in 2002. It was re-released in 2008 as part of the Sight & Sound series which also includes a DVD of the performance, while the CD features a different order of the songs and adds the bonus track "Untouchables".

== Track listing ==
No.	Title	Lyrics	Length
1.	"Cradle of Love"	Billy Idol, David Werner	4:32
2.	"Don't Need a Gun"	Idol	6:02
3.	"Flesh for Fantasy"	Idol, Steve Stevens	6:50
4.	"White Wedding"	Idol	3:47
5.	"Sweet Sixteen"	Idol	5:00
6.	"To Be a Lover"	William Bell, Booker T. Jones	3:58
7.	"Rebel Yell"	Idol, Stevens	5:11
8.	"Kiss Me Deadly"	Idol, Tony James	5:04
9.	"Eyes Without A Face"	Idol, Stevens	5:31
10.	"Dancing With Myself"	Idol, James	4:58
11.	"Ready Steady Go"	Idol, James	3:13
12.	"Blue Highway"	Idol, Stevens	5:42
13.	"Mony Mony"	Tommy James, Bo Gentry, Richie Cordell, Bobby Bloom	4:06
14.	"L.A. Woman"	Jim Morrison, Robby Krieger, Ray Manzarek, John Densmore	5:53

== Musicians ==
- Billy Idol – vocals, guitar
- Steve Stevens – guitar
- Stephen McGrath – bass guitar
- Mark Shulman – drums
- Joseph Simon – keyboards
- Greg Ellis – percussion
- Stella Soleil – backing vocals
