= Kings & Queens of the Underground =

Studio album by Billy Idol
- Released: 17 October 2014
- Recorded: January 2010 – September 2014
- Studio: Sarm (London); Echo (Los Angeles)
- Genre: New wave; hard rock
- Length: 47:42
- Label: BFI
- Producer: Trevor Horn; Greg Kurstin

Billy Idol chronology
The Very Best of Billy Idol: Idolize Yourself (2008)	Kings & Queens of the Underground (2014)	Vital Idol: Revitalized (2018)

Singles from Kings & Queens of the Underground
- 1. "Can't Break Me Down" Released: 15 September 2014

Professional ratings
Aggregate scores
Source	Rating
AnyDecentMusic?	5.3/10
Metacritic	64/100
Review scores
Source	Rating
AllMusic	3/5 stars
The Arts Desk	3/5 stars
Classic Rock	4.5/5 stars
The Guardian	3/5 stars
laut.de	2/5 stars
Mojo	3/5 stars
The Observer	1/5 stars
Q	4/5 stars
Record Collector	4/5 stars
Rolling Stone	3/5 stars

Kings & Queens of the Underground is the eighth studio album by the English rock singer Billy Idol, released on 17 October 2014 by BFI Records. It was Idol's first album of new material since Devil's Playground (2005). It debuted at number 34 on the Billboard 200, becoming Idol's highest-debuting album to date, and number 9 on the Billboard Top Rock Albums chart for the week of 8 November 2014. Videos were released for the songs "Can't Break Me Down" and "Save Me Now".

== Background ==
The album features new-wave synthesizers and keyboards, reflecting a new creative direction for Idol, and includes autobiographical lyrical themes from his co-written autobiography, Dancing With Myself. The title track was a collaborative effort, with Idol conceiving the concept and then, with his band, paying homage to fallen New York rock and roll heroes.The initial recording sessions were completed, but Idol felt the album was still incomplete. To finish the record, Idol reached out to Greg Kurstin, who wrote and produced the songs that would become the album's single.

== Tour ==
The Kings & Queens of the Underground Tour started on 5 November 2014 and ended 4 April 2015. Over the 40-date tour, Idol with his band performed in Europe, North America and Australia. The setlist included five songs from the album, "Postcards from the Past", "Can't Break Me Down", "Save Me Now", "Kings & Queens of the Underground" and "Whiskey and Pills", as well as 13 older songs and two guitar solos by Steve Stevens.

== Critical reception ==
The album was met with mixed to positive reception with the album receiving a combined score of 64/100 on Meatcritic. Classic Rock game the album a positive review stating “The plastic punk with the cartoon sneer has made his grown-up masterpiece.”

== Track listing ==
Kings & Queens of the Underground track listing
No.	Title	Writer(s)	Producer(s)	Length
1.	"Bitter Pill"	Billy Idol; Eric Bazilian; Glen Goss	Trevor Horn	3:57
2.	"Can't Break Me Down"	Idol; Greg Kurstin; Dan Nigro	Greg Kurstin	3:42
3.	"Save Me Now"	Idol; George William Lewis; Kurstin	Kurstin	4:31
4.	"One Breath Away"	Idol; Steve Stevens; Billy Morrison	Horn	4:10
5.	"Postcards from the Past"	Idol; Stevens; Morrison	Horn	4:20
6.	"Kings & Queens of the Underground"	Idol; Stevens; Morrison	Horn	4:53
7.	"Eyes Wide Shut"	Idol; Stevens; Morrison	Horn	4:29
8.	"Ghosts in My Guitar"	Idol; Stevens	Horn	4:47
9.	"Nothing to Fear"	Idol; Stevens; Morrison	Horn	4:39
10.	"Love and Glory"	Idol; Stevens; Morrison	Horn	4:28
11.	"Whiskey and Pills"	Idol; Brian Tichy	Horn	3:43

iTunes bonus track
No.	Title	Writer(s)	Length
12.	"Hollywood Promises"	Idol; Tichy	4:11

Japanese version bonus tracks
No.	Title	Writer(s)	Producer(s)	Length
12.	"Hollywood Promises"	Idol; Tichy		4:11
13.	"Cradle of Love" (live from Vienna)	Idol; David Werner	Keith Forsey	4:42
14.	"Dancing with Myself" (live from Vienna)	Idol; Tony James	Forsey	5:39

== Personnel ==
- Billy Idol – vocals (all tracks)
- Steve Stevens – lead, rhythm guitar (all tracks), acoustic guitar (tracks 1, 6–8, 11)
- Billy Morrison – rhythm guitar (tracks 4, 9)
- Trevor Horn – bass guitar (tracks 1, 4–11), programming (tracks 5, 7, 8), keyboards (tracks 6, 8, 11)
- Ash Soan – drums (tracks 1, 4, 6–10), percussion (tracks 1, 8)
- Matt Chamberlain – drums (track 3)
- Joel M Peters – drums (track 11)
- Tim Weidner – percussion (tracks 4, 9, 11), programming (track 7)
- Julian Hinton – orchestral arrangement and programming (tracks 4, 6, 8, 10)
- Pete Murray – orchestral arrangement and programming (track 7)
- Geoff Downes – keyboards (tracks 1, 4–10)
- Cameron Gower Poole – programming (tracks 1, 4, 9), keyboards (tracks 7, 9, 11), guitar (track 9)
- Greg Kurstin – guitar (track 2), bass guitar (tracks 2, 3), keyboards (tracks 2, 3), drums (track 2), programming (track 3)
- Josh Campbell – programming (tracks 1, 5), guitar (track 5), bass guitar (track 11)
- Renate Sokolovska – flute (track 6)

== Charts ==
Chart performance for Kings & Queens of the Underground
Chart (2014)	Peak position
Australian Albums (ARIA)	81
Austrian Albums (Ö3 Austria)	17
Belgian Albums (Ultratop Flanders)	109
Belgian Albums (Ultratop Wallonia)	127
Czech Albums (ČNS IFPI)	69
Danish Albums (Hitlisten)	24
Dutch Albums (Album Top 100)	75
Finnish Albums (Suomen virallinen lista)	37
French Albums (SNEP)	102
German Albums (Offizielle Top 100)	8
Italian Albums (FIMI)	45
Scottish Albums (OCC)	39
Swiss Albums (Schweizer Hitparade)	10
UK Albums (OCC)	35
UK Independent Albums (OCC)	4
US Billboard 200	34
US Independent Albums (Billboard)	4
US Top Alternative Albums (Billboard)	5
US Top Rock Albums (Billboard)	9

== Release history ==
Release history and formats for Kings & Queens of the Underground
Region	Date	Format(s)	Label
Australia	17 October 2014	CD; digital download	BFI
Germany	17 October 2014	CD; digital download	BFI
United Kingdom	20 October 2014	CD; digital download	BFI
Canada	21 October 2014	CD; digital download	BFI
United States	21 October 2014	CD; digital download	BFI
