= Vital Idol =

1985 remix album by Billy Idol

- Original 1985 cover

Remix album by Billy Idol
- Released: 31 May 1985
- Genres: Rock; dance-rock
- Length: 42:22
- Label: Chrysalis
- Producer: Keith Forsey

Billy Idol chronology
Rebel Yell (1983)	Vital Idol (1985)	Whiplash Smile (1986)

Alternative cover
- 1987 edition cover

Vital Idol is a remix album by the English rock singer Billy Idol, released on 31 May 1985 by Chrysalis Records. It contains remixed songs from his first two albums and the Don't Stop EP. The album was reissued in the United States with one extra track in September 1987, peaking at number 10 on the Billboard 200. The US release was supported by a non-album live single version of "Mony Mony".

The original release, sporting a photo from the "Dancing with Myself" video, was first issued in Europe in 1985. It peaked at number seven on the UK Albums Chart, outperforming Idol's previous studio albums. The US release was expanded to feature the "Mother of Mercy Mix" of "To Be a Lover" and reissued in 1987 with different cover art, featuring a photo still from the live video for "Mony Mony" on CD. The 1987 issue was 24-bit digitally remastered and released globally in 2002.

The album has been certified platinum by both the British Phonographic Industry (BPI) and Recording Industry Association of America (RIAA).

== Background ==
Most of the tracks are the original 12″ extended versions, except "Catch My Fall", which features a new remix with some re-recorded instruments. "What we would always do is we knew we had certain songs where we wanted to have some space to do remixes," guitarist Steve Stevens said in 2014. "So we'd leave 16 bars or 32 bars in the middle of the song no matter what the song was and then do an edit on it later and that left us room to experiment for a dance remix."

The album's title was inspired by a 1974 single by reggae artist Horace Andy titled "Ital Vital".

== Critical reception ==
Professional ratings
Review scores
Source	Rating
AllMusic	2/5 stars
Record Mirror	3.5/5 stars
Robert Christgau	B+
The Rolling Stone Album Guide	4/5 stars

In his review for AllMusic, Steve Huey wrote: "It doesn't really work as a hits collection, since it's missing key songs like 'Rebel Yell' and 'Eyes Without a Face,' and most of the dance remixes are repetitious and uninteresting compared to the originals." In The Rolling Stone Album Guide, Mark Coleman called the album "both a cynical recycling ploy and the essential Billy Idol album".

== Track listing ==
Vital Idol (1985)
No.	Title	Writer(s)	Origin	Length
1.	"White Wedding (Parts I & II)" (Shotgun Mix)	Billy Idol	Billy Idol, 1982	8:20
2.	"Dancing with Myself" (Uptown Mix)	Idol, Tony James	Don't Stop, 1981	5:57
3.	"Flesh for Fantasy" (Below the Belt Mix)	Idol, Steve Stevens	Rebel Yell, 1983	7:04
4.	"Catch My Fall" (Remix Fix)	Idol	Rebel Yell	4:56
5.	"Mony Mony" (Downtown Mix)	Tommy James, Bo Gentry, Ritchie Cordell, Bobby Bloom	Don't Stop	5:01
6.	"Love Calling" (Rub a Dub Dub Mix)	Idol, Keith Forsey	Billy Idol	5:33
7.	"Hot in the City" (Exterminator Mix)	Idol	Billy Idol	5:09
Total length:				42:22

Vital Idol – US version (1987)
No.	Title	Writer(s)	Origin	Length
1.	"White Wedding (Parts I & II)" (Shotgun Mix)	Idol	Billy Idol	8:20
2.	"Mony Mony" (Downtown Mix)	James, Gentry, Cordell, Bloom	Don't Stop	5:01
3.	"Hot in the City" (Exterminator Mix)	Idol	Billy Idol	5:09
4.	"Dancing with Myself" (Uptown Mix)	Idol, James	Don't Stop	5:57
5.	"Flesh for Fantasy" (Below the Belt Mix)	Idol, Stevens	Rebel Yell	7:04
6.	"To Be a Lover" (Mother of Mercy Mix)	William Bell, Booker T. Jones	Whiplash Smile, 1986	6:49
7.	"Love Calling" (Rub a Dub Dub Mix)	Idol, Forsey	Billy Idol	5:33
8.	"Catch My Fall" (Remix Fix)	Idol	Rebel Yell	4:56
Total length:				49:45

Vital Idol – Japan reissue (1987)
No.	Title	Writer(s)	Origin	Length
1.	"White Wedding (Parts I & II)" (Shotgun Mix)	Idol	Billy Idol	8:20
2.	"Mony Mony" (Hung Like a Pony Mix)	James, Gentry, Cordell, Bloom	Don't Stop	7:00
3.	"Hot in the City" (Exterminator Mix)	Idol	Billy Idol	5:10
4.	"Dancing with Myself" (Uptown Mix)	Idol, James	Don't Stop	5:59
5.	"Flesh for Fantasy" (Below the Belt Mix)	Idol, Stevens	Rebel Yell	7:04
6.	"To Be a Lover" (Mother of Mercy Mix)	Bell, Jones	Whiplash Smile	6:48
7.	"Love Calling" (Rub a Dub Dub Mix)	Idol, Forsey	Billy Idol	5:33
8.	"Catch My Fall" (Remix Fix)	Idol	Rebel Yell	4:56
9.	"Shakin' All Over" (Live)	Johnny Kidd	"Mony Mony" (Live) single, 1987	4:39
10.	"Mony Mony" (Live)	James, Gentry, Cordell, Bloom	"Mony Mony" (Live) single	4:06
Total length:				58:30

== Personnel ==
Adapted from the album liner notes.

- Keith Forsey – producer, remixing
- Gary Langan – remixing ("Flesh for Fantasy", "To Be a Lover")
- Billy Idol – remixing ("Catch My Fall")
- Steve Stevens – remixing ("Catch My Fall")
- Tom Lord-Alge – remixing ("Mony Mony" (Hung Like a Pony Mix), "Mony Mony" (Live), "Shakin' All Over")

== Charts ==
=== Weekly charts ===
1985 weekly chart performance for Vital Idol
Chart (1985)	Peak position
Australian Albums (Kent Music Report)	38
European Albums (Music & Media)	19
Finnish Albums (Suomen virallinen lista)	13
German Albums (Offizielle Top 100)	8
New Zealand Albums (RMNZ)	8
Swedish Albums (Sverigetopplistan)	19
Swiss Albums (Schweizer Hitparade)	24
UK Albums (Official Charts)	7

1987–1988 weekly chart performance for Vital Idol
Chart (1987–1988)	Peak position
Australian Albums (Australian Music Report)	12
Canada Top Albums/CDs (RPM)	1
New Zealand Albums (RMNZ)	14
UK Albums (Official Charts)	41
US Billboard 200	10

=== Year-end charts ===
1985 year-end chart performance for Vital Idol
Chart (1985)	Position
German Albums (Offizielle Top 100)	36
New Zealand Albums (RMNZ)	50
UK Albums (Gallup)	67

1987 year-end chart performance for Vital Idol
Chart (1987)	Position
Canada Top Albums/CDs (RPM)	21

1988 year-end chart performance for Vital Idol
Chart (1988)	Position
Australian Albums (ARIA)	49
Canada Top Albums/CDs (RPM)	41
US Billboard 200	71

== Certifications ==
Certifications for Vital Idol
Region	Certification	Certified units/sales
Canada (Music Canada)	4× Platinum	400,000^{^}
France (SNEP)	Gold	100,000^{*}
Germany (BVMI)	Gold	250,000^{^}
New Zealand (RMNZ)	Gold	7,500^{^}
United Kingdom (BPI)	Platinum	300,000^{^}
United States (RIAA)	Platinum	1,000,000^{^}
^{*} Sales figures based on certification alone.^{^} Shipments figures based on certification alone.

== Vital Idol: Revitalized ==
Vital Idol: Revitalized

Remix album by Billy Idol
- Released: 28 September 2018
- Genres: Rock; electronica
- Length: 42:43
- Label: Capitol

Billy Idol chronology
Kings & Queens of the Underground (2014)	Vital Idol: Revitalized (2018)	The Roadside (2021)

Vital Idol: Revitalized is a remix album by the English rock singer Billy Idol, released on 28 September 2018. The album has been described as a "modern-day upgrade" of Vital Idol. The digital version features four additional remixes, including a new Billy Idol and Steve Stevens remix of "Mony Mony" and "Save Me Now" (Lost Dog Remix), reworked by Idol's son, Willem Wolfe with Brandon Rauch and Ed Bedrosian.

=== Track listing ===
Vital Idol: Revitalized track listing
No.	Title	Writer(s)	Origin	Length
1.	"White Wedding" (CRAY Remix)	Idol	Billy Idol	3:28
2.	"Dancing with Myself" (RAC Remix)	Idol, James	Don't Stop	3:33
3.	"Eyes Without a Face" (Tropkillaz Remix)	Idol, Stevens	Rebel Yell	3:50
4.	"Rebel Yell" (The Crystal Method Remix)	Idol, Stevens	Rebel Yell	5:23
5.	"(Do Not) Stand in the Shadows" (Moby Remix)	Idol, Stevens	Rebel Yell	4:21
6.	"Flesh for Fantasy" (St Francis Hotel Remix)	Idol, Stevens	Rebel Yell	3:37
7.	"Catch My Fall" (Juan Maclean Remix)	Idol	Rebel Yell	5:31
8.	"One Breath Away" (Paul Oakenfold Remix)	Idol, Stevens, Billy Morrison	Kings & Queens of the Underground, 2014	3:21
9.	"To Be a Lover" (DJDS Remix)	Bell, Jones	Whiplash Smile	3:04
10.	"Don't Need a Gun" (Shiba San Remix)	Idol	Whiplash Smile	3:26
11.	"Hot in the City" (Shotgun Mike Remix)	Idol	Billy Idol	3:09
Total length:				42:43

Digital version (bonus tracks)
No.	Title	Writer(s)	Origin	Length
12.	"Mony Mony" (Idol/Stevens Remix)	James, Gentry, Cordell, Bloom	Don't Stop	5:41
13.	"One Breath Away" (Paul Oakenfold Remix – Extended Version)	Idol, Stevens, Morrison	Kings & Queens of the Underground	4:58
14.	"(Do Not) Stand in the Shadows" (Moby Remix – Half Speed Version)	Idol, Stevens	Rebel Yell	4:30
15.	"Save Me Now" (Lost Dog Remix)	Idol, George William Lewis, Greg Kurstin	Kings & Queens of the Underground	4:42

=== Release history ===
Release history for Vital Idol: Revitalized
Region	Date	Format	Label
Various	28 September 2018	CD; digital download	Capitol
Various	16 November 2018	LP	Capitol
