= VH1 Storytellers (disambiguation) =

VH1 Storytellers is a television music series produced by the VH1 network.

VH1 Storytellers may also refer to:

- VH1 Storytellers (Alicia Keys album), 2013
- VH1 Storytellers (David Bowie album), 2009
- VH1 Storytellers (Bruce Springsteen album), 2005
- VH1 Storytellers: Johnny Cash & Willie Nelson, 1998
- VH1 Storytellers (Kanye West album), 2010
- VH1 Storytellers (Ringo Starr album), 1998
- VH1 Storytellers (Billy Idol album), 2002
