= Hot in the City =

Single by Billy Idol

from the album Billy Idol
- B-side: "Hole in the Wall"
- Released: July 1982
- Genre: New wave; glam rock
- Length: 3:38
- Label: Chrysalis
- Songwriter: Billy Idol
- Producer: Keith Forsey

Billy Idol singles chronology
"Mony Mony" (1981)	"Hot in the City" (1982)	"White Wedding" (1982)

Music video
- "Hot in the City" on YouTube
- "Hot in the City (Exterminator Mix)" on YouTube

"Hot in the City" is a song by the English rock singer Billy Idol, released in 1982 as the first single from his eponymous debut studio album. It charted at No. 23 in the US and No. 58 in the UK. A remix of the song was released in 1987 and reached No. 13 in the UK.

== 1987 release ==
The Exterminator Mix of the song was released as a single in the UK on 29 December 1987. It charted higher in the UK this time round, peaking at No. 13 in early 1988. This version was first released in 1985 on the remix album Vital Idol.

== Music video ==
There are two versions of the video. The first version (the 1982 version) starts off with a girl walking into a record store. She picks up a Billy Idol record and the song starts to play. The video features scenes from New York City, interspersed with stock footage of nuclear bomb tests. The second version (the 1987 version) depicted Idol's girlfriend Perri Lister bound to a cross; it was banned by MTV. The later version was included on the DVD edition of The Very Best of Billy Idol: Idolize Yourself.

== Other versions and covers ==
Although the released version of the song has Idol shouting "New York!", other versions of the song were recorded for various radio stations, including ones for such cities as "Amarillo", "Boston", "Chicago", "Cleveland", "Minneapolis", "New Haven", "Phoenix", "Philly", "Chattanooga", and "Sioux Falls", or none at all with a repeated synthesizer stab instead.

== Track listings ==
- (1982) UK 7" vinyl single
1. "Hot in the City"
2. "Dead on Arrival"
- (1982) UK 12" vinyl single
1. "Hot in the City" (Extended Version)
2. "Dead on Arrival"
- (1987) UK 7" vinyl single
1. "Hot in the City" (Exterminator Fix)
2. "Catch My Fall" (Remix Fix)
- (1987) UK 12" vinyl single
1. "Hot in the City" (Exterminator Mix)
2. "Catch My Fall" (Remix Fix)
3. "Soul Standing By"

== Chart performance ==
=== Weekly charts ===
Chart (1982)	Peak position
Australia	18
Austria	10
Canada	34
Luxembourg (Radio Luxembourg)	30
New Zealand	5
UK Singles	58
U.S. Billboard Hot 100	23
U.S. Cash Box Top 100	27

Chart (1987–88)	Peak position
Australia	58
Belgium	26
Canada	43
Luxembourg (Radio Luxembourg)	11
Netherlands	32
New Zealand	19
Switzerland	19
UK Singles	13
U.S. Billboard Hot 100	48
U.S. Billboard Mainstream Rock Tracks	31
U.S. Cash Box Top 100	57

- ^{1}Re-released in 1987

=== Year-end charts ===
Chart (1982)	Rank
Australia	108
New Zealand	50
U.S. Billboard Hot 100	90

== Certifications ==
Region	Certification	Certified units/sales
New Zealand (RMNZ)	Gold	15,000^{‡}
^{‡} Sales+streaming figures based on certification alone.
