= Dancing with Myself =

1980 single by Gen X

Single by Gen X

from the album Kiss Me Deadly
- B-side: "Ugly Rash"
- Released: October 1980
- Genre: New wave; disco-punk; post-punk; dance-rock
- Length: 3:45 (album version); 3:30 (7" version); 4:06 (12" version)
- Label: Chrysalis
- Songwriters: Billy Idol; Tony James
- Producer: Keith Forsey

Gen X singles chronology
"Friday's Angels" (1979)	"Dancing with Myself" (1980)	"Untouchables" (1981)

"Dancing with Myself"

Single by Billy Idol

from the EP Don't Stop
- Released: March 1981
- Recorded: 1980 (remixed in 1981)
- Genre: New wave; disco-punk; post-punk; dance-rock
- Length: 4:50 (EP version); 3:19 (single version); 6:05 (12" version)
- Label: Chrysalis
- Songwriters: Billy Idol; Tony James
- Producer: Keith Forsey

Billy Idol singles chronology
"Dancing with Myself" (1981)	"Mony Mony" (1981)

Music video
- "Dancing with Myself" on YouTube

"Dancing with Myself" is a song by the English band Gen X, first released in the United Kingdom in October 1980, where it reached number 62 on the UK singles chart. It was remixed and re-released by the band's frontman Billy Idol as a solo artist in the United States in 1981, where the song reached number 27 on the US Hot Dance Club Play chart.

== Composition ==
Both versions of "Dancing with Myself" are primarily new wave, disco-punk, post-punk, and dance-rock songs, but critics have also described them as power pop, glam rock, and pop-punk. The song's lyrics, commonly misinterpreted as a metaphor for masturbation, were inspired by an experience Generation X had while touring Japan in mid-1979. Frontman Billy Idol and bassist Tony James were struck by the sight of the young crowd in a Tokyo discotheque dancing with their own reflections in mirrored walls rather than with one another.

== Production ==
The song was written and first recorded by Generation X during demo sessions in mid-1979 at Olympic Studios in West London. This demo recording was first officially released on the album K.M.D.-Sweet Revenge (1998). After that band had split later in that year, Idol and James re-branded the act as Gen X, and in production sessions with Keith Forsey for a new long-player at AIR Studios in London in mid-1980, the song was re-recorded for commercial release as a single. The guitar parts of the song were a mix of the playing of three guitarists with distinctively differing styles, viz. Steve New playing the lead, Steve Jones playing rhythm, with another layer being added by Danny Kustow.

== Release ==
First released in October 1980 as a preview of the new band's forthcoming long-player Kiss Me Deadly (1981), "Dancing with Myself" was a retail failure, reaching only number 62 in the UK Singles Chart in a 2-week chart run, then number 60 in its 4-week reappearance in early 1981.

The 1981 LP version runs 3:46 and is nearly the same as the 3:30 7" version, differing only in the last 30 seconds.

In 1981, Idol, now a solo artist after Gen X had broken up, had Forsey remix the song, reducing the prominence of the guitars & bass and removing the tambourine. This was released on the Gen X (a.k.a. 4) EP, with the 7" edition containing a 3:20 version and the 12" edition containing a 6:05 extended version.

Launching Idol's career in the U.S. market in 1981, the 3:20 version was released on 7" vinyl (credited to "Billy Idol and Gen X"), and the extended version was released on a promo-only 12". The extended version was also edited down to a 4:51 long version, which was commercially released on Idol's Don't Stop 12" EP, which was a dance club hit.

In 1983, the song was reissued commercially and bombed again, not charting at all in the UK, and only reaching #102 in the U.S. on the Billboard Bubbling Under chart. For this reissue, the U.S. got the 3:20 single version on 7" only, and the UK/EU market got a 7" containing the long version and a 12" containing the extended version.

The 3:20 version later appeared on Idol's 11 of the Best compilation, and the extended version appeared as the "Uptown Mix" on the Vital Idol compilation.

== Music video ==
For the 1981 United States single release, a music video for use on the newly launched MTV was made, directed by Tobe Hooper, with Idol in a scenario drawn from the 1971 cinema film The Omega Man, playing a lone figure in a post-apocalyptic cityscape besieged upon a skyscraper rooftop by partying mutant street-waifs.

== Formats and track listings ==
=== Gen X release ===
7" Chrysalis – CHS 2444 (UK)

1. "Dancing with Myself" (3:30)
2. "Ugly Rash" (4:30)

12" Chrysalis – CHS 12 2444 (UK)

1. "Dancing with Myself" (4:06)
2. "Loopy Dub" (5:08)
3. "Ugly Dub" (3:05)

12" Chrysalis – CHS 2488 (45 rpm)

1. "Dancing with Myself"
2. "Untouchables"
3. "Rock On"
4. "King Rocker" (produced by Ian Hunter)

=== Billy Idol release ===
7" Chrysalis – CHS 2488 (US)

1. "Dancing with Myself" (3:19) [Labelled as "Billy Idol featuring Generation X"]
2. "Happy People" (4:23)

7" Chrysalis – IDOL 1 (UK – 1983)

1. "Dancing with Myself" (3:19) [Labelled as "Billy Idol featuring Generation X"]
2. "Love Calling (Dub)" (5:33)

12" Chrysalis – IDOLX 1 (UK – 1983)

1. "Dancing with Myself" (6:05) [Labelled as "Billy Idol featuring Generation X"]
2. "Love Calling (Dub)" (5:33)
3. "White Wedding" (8:20)
4. "Hot in the City" (5:20)

== Charts ==
=== Gen X version ===
Chart (1980–1981)	Peak position
UK Singles Chart	60

=== Billy Idol version ===
Chart (1981)	Peak position
US Hot Dance Club Play (Billboard)	27
US Bubbling Under Hot 100 Singles (Billboard)	102
Chart (1983)	Peak position
Canada Top Singles (RPM)	39
New Zealand (Recorded Music NZ)	9

== Certifications ==
Region	Certification	Certified units/sales
New Zealand (RMNZ)	Platinum	30,000^{‡}
^{‡} Sales+streaming figures based on certification alone.

== Maren Morris version ==
"Dancing with Myself"

Single by Maren Morris
- Released: 15 February 2024
- Length: 4:11
- Label: Columbia
- Songwriters: Billy Idol; Tony James
- Producer: Gabe Simon

Maren Morris singles chronology
"42" (2023)	"Dancing with Myself" (2024)	"Cut!" (2024)

Music video
- "Dancing with Myself" on YouTube

In 2024, the song was re-arranged and covered by American singer and songwriter Maren Morris. Released as a single on 15 February 2024, under Columbia Records in a partnership with the mobile app Visible for their "Singles Awareness Day" campaign, it marks Morris's first release since her 2023 extended play, The Bridge.

=== Background and composition ===
Morris's version features banjos, strummed acoustic guitars which are complemented by Morris' signature smoky vocals on the track produced by Gabe Simon. Morris said about the cover origin: "I partnered with Visible because I loved the theme of their messaging, which is independence and ownership", she added, "For me right now, I'm really leaning into my sort of singleness and it's daunting but exciting." She also explained further why she chose Idol's song to cover: "I decided to cover one of my longtime favorite songs by Billy Idol because it's always been a beautifully melancholic anthem for me, it also captures where I am at right now; a little blue but a lot relieved. Dancing through my feelings and shaking off the expired layers that no longer strengthen me."

=== Reception ===
Morris' version received mostly positive reviews by music critics. Gil Kaufman for Billboard praised Morris' delivery, stating that the singer "sounds perfectly fine on her own". Scott Bernstein for JamBase dubbed the cover as a "fresh spin" of Idol's song. In a more mixed review, Tom Breihan for Stereogum said that Morris' cover doesn't "seem likely to incite much dancing" describing it as "significantly less rambunctious and more serene" in comparison to the original.

=== Music video ===
An official music video directed by Mehdi Zollo, sponsored by Visible was released alongside the single. The video was shot in East Nashville at Grimey's Records, and shows Morris dancing through the record store, sporting a leather trenchcoat, white tank top, jeans, and sunglasses. The music video pays homage to the 2000 film High Fidelity.

=== Release history ===
Release date and formats for Maren Morris version
Region	Date	Format(s)	Label	Ref.
Various	15 February 2024	Digital download; streaming	Columbia	

== The Vampire Lestat version ==
"Dancing with Myself"

Single by The Vampire Lestat
- Released: 24 April 2026
- Genre: Dance-rock
- Length: 3:56
- Label: Lakeshore
- Songwriters: Billy Idol; Tony James
- Producers: Daniel Hart; Danny Reisch

The Vampire Lestat singles chronology
"All Fall Down" (2026)	"Dancing with Myself" (2026)	"Butterscotch Bitch" (2026)

In 2026, the song was covered by Australian actor Sam Reid (credited as The Vampire Lestat, the character he portrays in the series Interview with the Vampire) and produced by Daniel Hart and Danny Reisch for the third season of AMC's gothic horror series Interview with the Vampire, retitled The Vampire Lestat after Anne Rice's 1985 novel of the same name and its lead character, a vampire rock star. Reid's version was featured on the official trailer for The Vampire Lestat released on 22 April 2026. It was released as The Vampire Lestat's third single by AMC Global Media and Lakeshore Records on streaming platforms on 24 April 2026.

=== Release history ===
Release date and formats for the Vampire Lestat version
Region	Date	Format(s)	Label(s)	Ref.
Various	24 April 2026	Digital download; streaming	Lakeshore	

== Appearances in popular culture ==
- Belgian rock band De Kreuners released a Dutch version of the song called "Ik dans wel met mezelf" in 1982.
- The song was used in the 1987 film Can't Buy Me Love.
- A cover version by Blink-182 was featured on the compilation album Before You Were Punk and on Taylor Steele's Loose Change film soundtrack.
