= Mony Mony (album) =

Studio album by Tommy James and the Shondells
- Released: July 1968
- Genres: Pop; garage rock
- Length: 27:34
- Label: Roulette

Tommy James and the Shondells chronology
Gettin' Together (1967)	Mony Mony (1968)	Crimson & Clover (1968)

Singles from Mony Mony
- 1. "Get Out Now" Released: 1968; 2. "Mony Mony" Released: March 1968; 3. "Somebody Cares" Released: 1968

Professional ratings
Review scores
Source	Rating
Allmusic	4/5 stars

Mony Mony is the fifth studio album by American rock band Tommy James and the Shondells. It was released in 1968. The record includes the band's hit single, the title track, which reached #1 on the UK Singles Chart and #3 on the Billboard Hot 100. It reached #193 on the Billboard 200. While trying to come up with lyrics for the music they had already recorded, James spotted a sign for Mutual of New York, sing their acronym MONY.

== Track listing ==
No.	Title	Writer	Length
1.	"Mony Mony"	Bobby Bloom, Bo Gentry, Tommy James, Ritchie Cordell	2:52
2.	"Do Unto Me"	Gary Illingsworth, Morris Levy, Richie Grasso	2:30
3.	"(I'm) Taken"	Peter Andreoli, Tommy James	2:28
4.	"Nighttime (I'm a Lover)"	Myrna March, Gary Illingworth, Richard Grasso	2:39
5.	"Run Away With Me"	T.H. Kidd (Paul Anka), Bobby Gosh	2:45
6.	"Somebody Cares"	Bo Gentry, Ritchie Cordell, Harvey Weisenfeld	2:41
7.	"Get Out Now"	Bo Gentry, Ritchie Cordell	2:08
8.	"I Can't Go Back to Denver"	Gary Illingworth, Richard Grasso, Daniel Cohen, Morris Levy	2:12
9.	"Some Kind of Love"	Peter Lucia, Tommy James	2:02
10.	"Gingerbread Man"	Mike Vale, Tommy James	2:56
11.	"One Two Three and I Fell"	James Calvert, Ritchie Cordell, Bo Gentry	2:21

== Charts ==
Album

Year	Chart	Peak Position
1968	Billboard 200	193

Singles

Year	Single	Chart	Peak position
1968	"Get Out Now"	Billboard Hot 100	48
1968	"Mony Mony"	Billboard Hot 100	3
1968	"Mony Mony"	UK Singles Chart	1
1968	"Somebody Cares"	Billboard Hot 100	53
