= Billy Idol (album) =

Studio album by Billy Idol
- Released: 2 July 1982
- Studio: Westlake (Los Angeles)
- Genres: Hard rock; new wave; pop
- Length: 39:51 (original); 43:11 (1983 reissue)
- Label: Chrysalis
- Producer: Keith Forsey

Billy Idol chronology
Don't Stop (1981)	Billy Idol (1982)	Rebel Yell (1983)

Alternative cover
- Cover for the 1983 reissue of the album.

Singles from Billy Idol
- 1. "Hot in the City" Released: July 1982; 2. "White Wedding" Released: October 1982

Professional ratings
Review scores
Source	Rating
AllMusic	4/5 stars
Robert Christgau	B
Smash Hits	1/10
Sounds	2/5 stars

Billy Idol is the debut studio album by the English rock singer Billy Idol, released on 2 July 1982 by Chrysalis Records. It was the first album by Idol since the break-up of punk rock band Gen X, and his first time collaborating with guitarist Steve Stevens. The album's success was helped by music videos of "Hot in the City" and "White Wedding" being in heavy rotation on MTV. Despite this, some criticized Idol for "selling out", even falsely claiming he was influenced by label executives and managers.

== Background and recording ==
The song "White Wedding (Part 1)" is so-named due to the less-heard "White Wedding (Part 2)", which is a more synthesiser-based continuation of the first part. It can be heard on the 12-inch version of the single and the compilation Vital Idol (1985).

"Hot in the City" was originally recorded for Idol's debut EP Don't Stop, but his label Chrysalis considered it too good just to release as part of the EP. They felt it could be a single and decided to keep it for the album.

== Release and critical reception ==
Upon its release, the album received generally positive reviews from music critics and was a commercial success, peaking at number forty-five on the Billboard 200. Billy Idol was certified gold by the Recording Industry Association of America (RIAA).

Three singles were released from the album: "Dancing with Myself" was already released in 1981 as Idol's debut single. The lead single, "Hot in the City", peaked at number 23 on the Billboard 100. "White Wedding" was released as the album's second single. After it peaked at number 3 on Mainstream Rock chart in 1983, the album was reissued with an addition of the earlier single "Dancing with Myself".

The album was described by observers as a fusion of hard rock, new wave and pop music.

== Track listing ==
Side one
No.	Title	Writer(s)	Length
1.	"Come On, Come On"	Billy Idol, Steve Stevens	4:00
2.	"White Wedding (Part 1)"	Idol	4:12
3.	"Hot in the City"	Idol	3:40
4.	"Dead on Arrival"	Idol	3:54
5.	"Nobody's Business"	Idol	4:06

Side two
No.	Title	Writer(s)	Length
1.	"Love Calling"	Idol, Keith Forsey	4:48
2.	"Hole in the Wall"	Idol	4:14
3.	"Shooting Stars"	Idol, Stevens	4:30
4.	"It's So Cruel"	Idol, Philip Hawk	5:20
5.	"Congo Man" (Reprise of "Love Calling")	Idol, Forsey	1:07
Total length:			39:51

1983 reissue, with Congo Man replaced with Dancing with Myself (although some later CD editions kept the original tracklisting).
No.	Title	Writer(s)	Length
10.	"Dancing with Myself"	Idol, Tony James	3:20
Total length:			43:11

2023 Expanded edition bonus track
No.	Title	Length
11.	"White Wedding" (Clubland Extended Remix)	12:38

2023 Expanded edition – disc two
No.	Title	Length
1.	"Baby Talk" (Live from The Roxy, West Hollywood, August 12, 1982)	3:12
2.	"Untouchables" (Live from The Roxy, West Hollywood, August 12, 1982)	4:01
3.	"Come On, Come On" (Live from The Roxy, West Hollywood, August 12, 1982)	4:50
4.	"Hot in the City" (Live from The Roxy, West Hollywood, August 12, 1982)	4:05
5.	"Dead on Arrival" (Live from The Roxy, West Hollywood, August 12, 1982)	4:12
6.	"Heavens Inside" (Live from The Roxy, West Hollywood, August 12, 1982)	3:00
7.	"Ready Steady Go" (Live from The Roxy, West Hollywood, August 12, 1982)	3:18
8.	"Hole in the Wall" (Live from The Roxy, West Hollywood, August 12, 1982)	5:12
9.	"Shooting Stars" (Live from The Roxy, West Hollywood, August 12, 1982)	4:24
10.	"Kiss Me Deadly" (Live from The Roxy, West Hollywood, August 12, 1982)	5:10
11.	"White Wedding" (Live from The Roxy, West Hollywood, August 12, 1982)	6:48
12.	"Nobody's Business" (Live from The Roxy, West Hollywood, August 12, 1982)	4:44
13.	"Dancing with Myself" (Live from The Roxy, West Hollywood, August 12, 1982)	5:47
14.	"Mony Mony" (Live from The Roxy, West Hollywood, August 12, 1982)	4:29
15.	"Triumph" (Live from The Roxy, West Hollywood, August 12, 1982)	3:58

- "Dancing with Myself" recorded September 1980, AIR Studios, London.

== Personnel ==
Musicians

- Billy Idol – vocals, guitar (except track 3)
- Steve Stevens – guitars, keyboards, synthesizer, bass (track 6)
- Phil Feit – bass (tracks 1–2, 4–5, 7–10)
- Steve Missal – drums (tracks 1, 4–5, 7–10)

Additional musicians

- Stephanie Spruill – backing vocals
- Keith Forsey – drums (tracks 2, 3 and 6)
- Ashley Otten – guitar (track 3)
- Mick Smiley – bass (track 3)
- Steve New − guitar (track 11)
- Steve Jones − guitar (track 11)
- Tony James – bass (track 11)
- Terry Chimes – drums (track 11)

Technical

- Keith Forsey – producer
- Brian Reeves – engineer
- Nigel Walker – engineer (track 11)
- Steve Bates – assistant engineer
- Brian Gardner – mastering
- Jules Bates – photography
- Perri Lister – make-up
- Janet Levinson – design
- Steve Stevens – arrangements
- Billy Idol – arrangements

== Charts ==
=== Weekly charts ===
Weekly chart performance for Billy Idol
Chart (1982–1983)	Peak position
Australian Albums (Kent Music Report)	66
Canada Top Albums/CDs (RPM)	6
New Zealand Albums (RMNZ)	5
Swedish Albums (Sverigetopplistan)	49
US Billboard 200	45
US Rock Albums (Billboard)	15

=== Year-end charts ===
1983 year-end chart performance for Billy Idol
Chart (1983)	Position
Canada Top Albums/CDs (RPM)	31
New Zealand Albums (RMNZ)	21

1984 year-end chart performance for Billy Idol
Chart (1984)	Position
New Zealand Albums (RMNZ)	23

== Certifications ==
Certifications for Billy Idol
Region	Certification	Certified units/sales
Canada (Music Canada)	Platinum	100,000^{^}
New Zealand (RMNZ)	Platinum	15,000^{^}
United States (RIAA)	Gold	500,000^{^}
^{^} Shipments figures based on certification alone.
