= Mony Mony =

1968 single by Tommy James and the Shondells

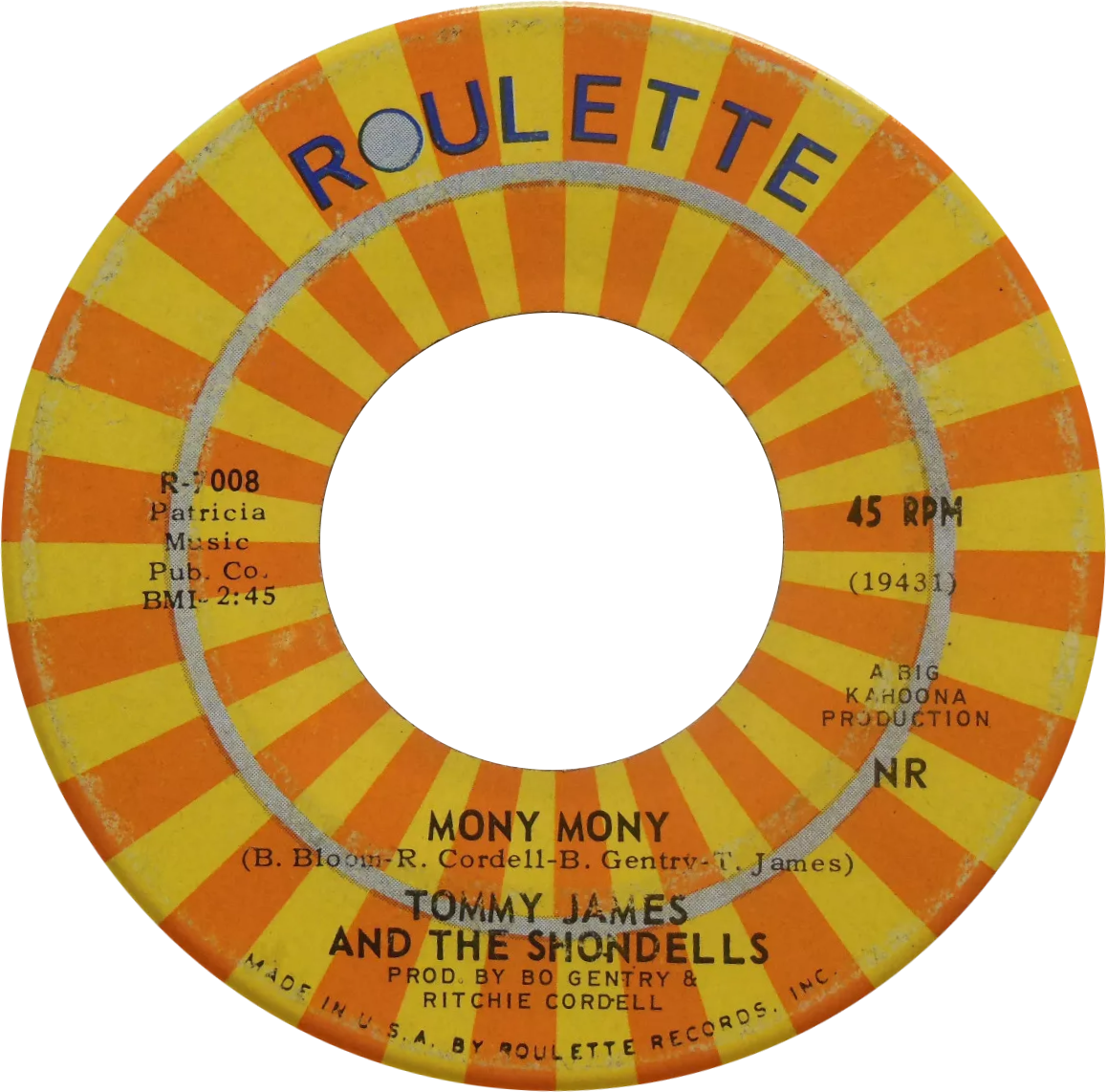
- Side A of the 1968 US original single

Single by Tommy James and the Shondells

from the album Mony Mony
- B-side: "One Two Three and I Fell"
- Released: March 1968
- Genre: Garage rock; rock and roll; R&B
- Length: 2:45
- Label: Roulette
- Songwriters: Tommy James; Bo Gentry; Ritchie Cordell; Bobby Bloom
- Producers: Bo Gentry, Ritchie Cordell

Tommy James and the Shondells singles chronology
"Get Out Now" (1968)	"Mony Mony" (1968)	"Somebody Cares" (1968)

Performance video
- "Mony Mony" by Tommy James and the Shondells on The Ed Sullivan Show (January 26, 1969) on YouTube

Audio
- "Mony Mony" by Tommy James and the Shondells on YouTube

"Mony Mony" is a song by American pop rock band Tommy James and the Shondells, released in 1968 as the second single from the album of the same name. It reached No. 1 on the UK Singles Chart and No. 3 in the U.S. Written by Bobby Bloom, Ritchie Cordell, Bo Gentry, and Tommy James, the song has appeared in various film and television works such as the Oliver Stone drama Heaven & Earth. It was also covered by English rock musician Billy Idol in 1981, and again in a live 1985 recording. His second version, not released until 1987, became a bigger hit than the Shondells' 1968 original, reaching No. 1 on the Billboard Hot 100 and top 40 internationally, and revived public interest in the Shondells' original. Idol's 1981 version failed to chart, although it did reach number seven on the dance charts.

== Tommy James and the Shondells version ==
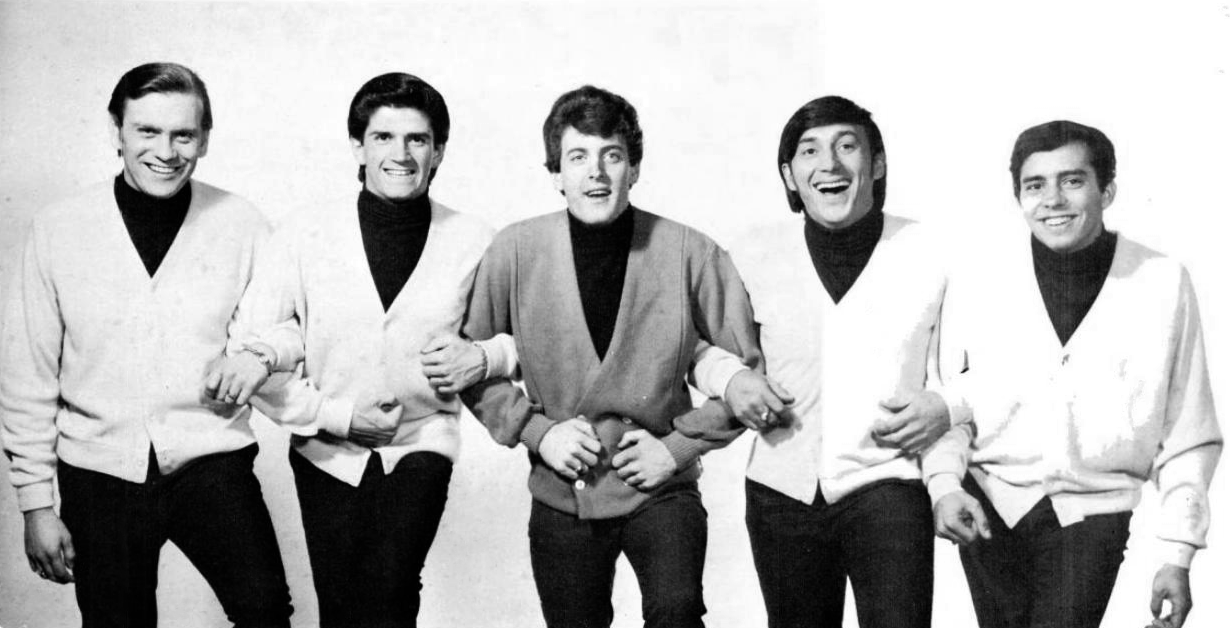
Tommy James and the Shondells, 1967

=== Background and release ===
"Mony Mony" was credited to Tommy James, Bo Gentry, Ritchie Cordell, and Bobby Bloom. The song's title was inspired by Tommy James' view of the "M.O.N.Y." sign atop the Mutual of New York Building on the New York City skyline from his Manhattan apartment. As James said in a 1995 interview in Hitch magazine:

True story: I had the track done before I had a title. I wanted something catchy like "Sloopy" or "Bony Maroney," but everything sounded so stupid. So Ritchie Cordell and I were writing it in New York City, and we were about to throw in the towel when I went out onto the terrace, looked up and saw the Mutual of New York building (which has its initials illuminated in red at its top). I said, "That's gotta be it! Ritchie, come here, you've gotta see this!" It's almost as if God Himself had said, "Here's the title." I've always thought that if I had looked the other way, it might have been called "Hotel Taft".

"Mony Mony" was the only song by the group to reach the top 20 in the United Kingdom; it reached No. 1 in the UK, No. 3 in the U.S. and Canada, and became a Top 10 hit across western Europe. A music video was made featuring the band performing the song amidst psychedelic backgrounds. A decade and a half later, it would receive renewed play on MTV.

=== Track listings and format ===
- Vinyl
1. "Mony Mony" – 2:45
2. "One Two Three and I Fell" – 2:32

=== Chart performance ===
Chart performance for "Mony Mony" by Tommy James and the Shondells
Chart (1968–1969)	Peak position
Austria	4
Belgium (Flanders)	7
Belgium (Wallonia)	3
Canada Top Singles (RPM)	3
Ireland (IRMA)	2
New Zealand (Listener)	11
Norway	8
South Africa (Springbok)	5
Switzerland	2
UK Singles (Official Charts)	1
US Billboard Hot 100	3
West Germany (GfK)	3

== Billy Idol version ==
"Mony Mony"
- US single of Billy Idol version

Single by Billy Idol

from the EP Don't Stop
- B-side: "Baby Talk"
- Released: August 1981
- Recorded: 1981
- Genre: New wave; dance-rock
- Length: 5:01 (studio version); 3:23 (single edit)
- Label: Chrysalis
- Songwriters: Tommy James; Bo Gentry; Ritchie Cordell; Bobby Bloom
- Producer: Keith Forsey

Billy Idol singles chronology
"Dancing with Myself" (1981)	"Mony Mony" (1981)	"Hot in the City" (1982)

Audio
- "Mony Mony" by Billy Idol on YouTube

"Mony Mony (Live)"

Single by Billy Idol

from the album Idol Songs: 11 of the Best
- B-side: "Shakin' All Over"
- Released: September 21, 1987 (UK)
- Recorded: 1985
- Genre: New wave; dance-rock
- Length: 4:00
- Label: Chrysalis
- Songwriters: Tommy James; Bo Gentry; Ritchie Cordell; Bobby Bloom
- Producer: Keith Forsey

Billy Idol singles chronology
"Soul Standing By" (1987)	"Mony Mony (Live)" (1987)	"Cradle of Love" (1990)

Live video
- "Mony Mony" (live, 1987) by Billy Idol on YouTube

=== Background and release ===
British rock musician Billy Idol released a cover version in 1981, as the second and final single from the Don't Stop EP. His version of "Mony Mony" went to No. 7 on the Billboard Dance chart. In his 2015 memoir, Dancing with Myself, Idol recalled that his affection for the song originally stemmed from a sexual encounter he had as a youth where it played in the background. Before proposing the cover to executives at Chrysalis Records, he originally suggested recording a cover of "Shout" before admitting his intentions for "Mony Mony".

A live version of the song was an even bigger hit for Idol. Recorded on a promotional tour for his then upcoming remix album Vital Idol (1985), it was released as a single in 1987 and went to No. 1 on the Billboard Hot 100, coincidentally displacing Tiffany's cover of another Tommy James song, "I Think We're Alone Now", from the top spot. It also finished directly behind the Tiffany cover at No. 19 on the 1987 year-end Billboard chart, and was No. 1 on the Canadian charts for 4 weeks.

Idol's version gave rise to an interesting custom. When the song was performed live or played at a club or dance, people would shout a formulaic, usually obscene, variation of a particular phrase in the two measures following each line, for example, "hey, say what... get laid, get fucked!" or "hey, motherfucker... get laid, get fucked!" This led to the song being banned from high-school dances across North America, although the custom continues at Idol concerts and sporting events today. It became so widespread that Idol eventually put the lyrics to record in the "Idol/Stevens Mix" of the song on the 2018 remix album Vital Idol: Revitalized.

=== Legacy ===
"Weird Al" Yankovic wrote a parody of this song from his album Even Worse, entitled "Alimony" (based on the live Idol version, complete with a live audience). It is about a recently divorced man complaining about his ex-wife taking everything he owns away from him in alimony payments.

In the 2014 Nissan Sentra commercial, part of the "Spread Your Joy" campaign, a man in a Sentra with Bose speakers belts out Billy Idol's "Mony Mony" while driving down the road. As he rides, he passes a school bus full of kids and a woman in a car, both of whom sing along with him. He also passes another driver who does not join in. The commercial ends with the man singing to himself as he walks into his house.

The song was used in the first trailer for the 2019 film, Hellboy.

=== Track listings and formats ===
- (1981) US 7" vinyl
1. "Mony Mony" (single edit) – 3:23
2. "Baby Talk" – 3:10
- (1981) UK 7" vinyl (33 1/3 rpm) & 12" vinyl (45 rpm)
1. "Mony Mony"
2. "Baby Talk"
3. "Untouchables"
4. "Dancing With Myself"
- (1987) UK 7" vinyl
1. "Mony Mony" (live)
2. "Shakin' All Over" (live)
- (1987) US 12" vinyl
1. "Mony Mony" (Hung Like a Pony Remix) – 6:59
2. "Mony Mony" (Steel-Toe Cat Dub) – 6:50
3. "Mony Mony" (live) – 4:00
4. "Mony Mony" (incorrectly listed as single edit) – 5:01
- (1987) UK 12" vinyl
1. "Mony Mony" (Hung Like a Pony Remix♰)
2. "Shakin' All Over" (live)
3. "Mony Mony" (live)

♰Mixed by Tom Lord-Alge

=== Chart performance ===
Original version

Chart performance for "Mony Mony" by Billy Idol
Chart (1981–1982)	Peak position
US Dance Club Songs (Billboard)	7

Live version

Weekly chart performance for "Mony Mony" (live version) by Billy Idol
Chart (1987–1988)	Peak position
Australia (Australian Music Report)	8
Canada Retail Singles (The Record)	1
Canada Top Singles (RPM)	1
Netherlands (Single Top 100)	89
Switzerland (Schweizer Hitparade)	13
New Zealand (Recorded Music NZ)	2
UK Singles (Official Charts)	7
US Billboard Hot 100	1
US Mainstream Rock (Billboard)	27
West Germany (GfK)	38

Year-end chart performance for "Mony Mony" (live version) by Billy Idol
Year-end chart (1987)	Position
Canada Top Singles (RPM)	6
US Billboard Hot 100	19

=== Certifications ===
Certifications for "Mony Mony"
Region	Certification	Certified units/sales
Canada (Music Canada)	Gold	50,000^{^}
New Zealand (RMNZ)	Gold	15,000^{‡}
^{^} Shipments figures based on certification alone.^{‡} Sales+streaming figures based on certification alone.
