= Visible (mobile app) =

Symptom tracking mobile app

- App screenshot
- Release: November 2022 (beta)
- Platform: Android, iOS
- Type: Symptom tracking
- Website: www.makevisible.com

Visible is a health tracking mobile app for people with long COVID and myalgic encephalomyelitis/chronic fatigue syndrome (ME/CFS).

The company was founded by a Harry Leeming, an engineer from London living with long Covid since 2020, and Luke Martin-Fuller.

In November 2022, Visible released an open beta of an app that aims to help people pace their activities to avoid post-exertional malaise. The app gathers data on exertion levels, symptom severity, and heart-rate variability. HRV is approximated using a smartphone's camera via a technique called photoplethysmography, and according to the app's developers, can indicate how much someone needs rest. The app is currently free, but is expected to be freemium in the future. Users can also opt to allow their data be used for research purposes. In July 2023, Visible and Imperial College London announced the start of the first two studies. One is on the effects of the menstrual cycle on long COVID symptoms, and the other is on the condition's epidemiology and economic impact.

Visible has announced plans to couple the app with activity trackers for continuous monitoring of heart-rate and actimetry data, which the developers claim will be more effective.

As of 2022, no clinical trials on Visible's effectiveness have been conducted.
