= Happy Holidays (Billy Idol album) =

Studio album by Billy Idol
- Released: 4 December 2006
- Recorded: 2006
- Genre: Christmas; pop rock
- Length: 46:37
- Label: Bodog Music, Dark Horse Records
- Producer: Billy Idol, Brian Tichy

Billy Idol chronology
Devil's Playground (2005)	Happy Holidays (2006)	The Very Best of Billy Idol: Idolize Yourself (2008)

Professional ratings
Review scores
Source	Rating
The Guardian	3/5 stars
Entertainment Weekly	D+
The Observer	1/5 stars

Happy Holidays is the seventh studio album by the English rock singer Billy Idol, released on 4 December 2006. It includes renditions of many traditional Christmas songs and two original songs, "Happy Holiday" and "Christmas Love". Music videos were released for "Jingle Bell Rock", "Happy Holiday", "White Christmas" and "Winter Wonderland".

A remixed version with a new cover and different track list was released on November 5, 2021. It was also issued on vinyl for the first time.

== Track listing ==
Happy Holidays track listing
No.	Title	Writer(s)	Length
1.	"Frosty the Snowman"	Walter "Jack" Rollins, Steve Nelson	2:28
2.	"Silver Bells"	Jay Livingston, Ray Evans	2:43
3.	"Happy Holiday"	Billy Idol	2:04
4.	"Merry Christmas Baby"	Johnny Moore; Lou Baxter	4:09
5.	"White Christmas"	Irving Berlin	2:34
6.	"Here Comes Santa Claus"	Gene Autry, Oakley Haldeman	2:02
7.	"God Rest Ye, Merry Gentlemen"	Traditional	2:58
8.	"Santa Claus Is Back in Town"	Jerry Leiber, Mike Stoller	3:22
9.	"Let It Snow! Let It Snow! Let It Snow!"	Sammy Cahn, Jule Styne	2:29
10.	"Winter Wonderland"	Felix Bernard, Richard B. Smith	2:21
11.	"Run Rudolph Run"	Johnny Marks, Marvin Brodie	3:03
12.	"Blue Christmas"	Bill Hayes; Jay Johnson	2:28
13.	"Jingle Bell Rock"	Jim Boothe; Joe Beal	2:04
14.	"Christmas Love"	Billy Idol	4:01
15.	"O Christmas Tree"	Melchior Franck	4:33
16.	"Silent Night"	Franz Xaver Gruber, Joseph Mohr	2:19
17.	"Auld Lang Syne"	Robert Burns	1:21

=== 2021 Remaster ===
No.	Title	Writer(s)	Length
1.	"Frosty the Snowman"	Walter E. Rollins, Steve Nelson	2:28
2.	"Silver Bells"	Jay Livingston, Ray Evans	2:43
3.	"Happy Holiday"	Billy Idol	2:04
4.	"White Christmas"	Irving Berlin	2:34
5.	"Here Comes Santa Claus"	Gene Autry, Oakley Haldeman	2:02
6.	"God Rest Ye, Merry Gentlemen"	Traditional	2:58
7.	"Santa Claus Is Back in Town"	Jerry Leiber, Mike Stoller	3:22
8.	"Let It Snow"	Sammy Cahn, Jule Styne	2:29
9.	"Winter Wonderland"	Felix Bernard, Richard Bernhard Smith	2:21
10.	"Run Rudolph Run"	Johnny Marks, Marvin Brodie	3:03
11.	"Jingle Bell Rock"	Jim Boothe, Joe Beal	2:04
12.	"O Christmas Tree"	Melchior Franck	4:33
13.	"Silent Night"	Franz Gruber, Joseph Mohr	2:19
14.	"Auld Lang Syne"	Robert Burns	1:21
15.	"On Christmas Day"	Billy Idol, Brian Tichy	4:20

== Personnel ==
- Billy Idol – lead vocals
- Brian Tichy – guitars, bass guitar, drums
- Derek Sherinian – keyboards
- Steve Stevens – guitars on "On Christmas Day"

== Charts ==
Chart performance for Happy Holidays
Chart (2021)	Peak position
German Albums (Offizielle Top 100)	50
Swiss Albums (Schweizer Hitparade)	76
