= Catch My Fall =

Single by Billy Idol

from the album Rebel Yell
- B-side: "Daytime Drama"
- Released: 17 October 1984 (US)
- Genre: New wave; pop
- Length: 3:42
- Label: Chrysalis
- Songwriter: Billy Idol
- Producer: Keith Forsey

Billy Idol singles chronology
| "Flesh for Fantasy" (1984) | "Catch My Fall" (1984) | "To Be a Lover" (1986) |

Music video
- "Catch My Fall" on YouTube

"Catch My Fall" is a song by the English rock singer Billy Idol, released in 1984 as the fourth and final single from his second studio album Rebel Yell (1983). It was written by Idol and produced by Keith Forsey, with sax provided by Mars Williams.

== Critical reception ==
Billboard said that "Sharp dance tracks provide the pulse" and that Idol uses a "low-key melodic vocal" comparable to his vocal performance in "Eyes Without a Face."

In a review of the 1988 UK single re-release, Kevin Rowland of Record Mirror described "Catch My Fall" as a "tough song with a good build" and also praised the "good production and playing".

== Charts ==
| Chart (1984) | Peak position |
|---|---|
| Germany | 11 |
| New Zealand (Recorded Music NZ) | 42 |
| Canada Hot 100 (Billboard) | 28 |
| US Billboard Hot 100 | 50 |
| US Mainstream Rock (Billboard) | 24 |
| Chart (1988) | Peak position |
| UK Singles (Official Charts) | 63 |
