= Don't Stop (EP) =

EP by Billy Idol
- Released: October 1981
- Recorded: September 1980, July 1981
- Studios: AIR (London); Westlake (Los Angeles); Musicland West (Los Angeles)
- Genres: New wave, dance-rock
- Length: 16:44
- Labels: Chrysalis; F2 21729 / DIDX 5224
- Producer: Keith Forsey

Billy Idol chronology
Don't Stop (1981)	Billy Idol (1982)

Singles from Don't Stop
- 1. "Dancing with Myself" Released: 1981; 2. "Mony Mony" Released: 1981

Professional ratings
Review scores
Source	Rating
AllMusic	3/5 stars
Robert Christgau	B

Don't Stop is the debut extended play (EP) by the English rock singer Billy Idol, released in October 1981 by Chrysalis Records.

The EP contains a version of Tommy James and the Shondells' UK No. 1 hit "Mony Mony", a live version of which would later become a hit for Idol in 1987. It also contains the song "Dancing with Myself", which had previously been a commercially unsuccessful single release for Idol's former band Gen X in the UK in 1980. "Dancing With Myself" (from that band's LP Kiss Me Deadly) was not re-recorded for the Don't Stop EP release but was remixed from Gen X's 6:05 minute long extended version of the song and edited down into 4:50 minutes, from which a drum solo and chorus section were removed. "Untouchables" is another Gen X song taken from the 1980 album Kiss Me Deadly, which was re-recorded for Don't Stop.

== Track listing ==
Side one
No.	Title	Writer(s)	Length
1.	"Mony Mony"	Thomas Jackson, Robert Ackoff, Richard Rosenblatt, Bobby Bloom	5:01
2.	"Baby Talk"	Billy Idol	3:14

Side two
No.	Title	Writer(s)	Length
1.	"Untouchables"	Idol	3:39
2.	"Dancing with Myself"	Idol, Tony James	4:50

- The 1983 CD reissue of Don't Stop also includes a 12:50 length interview with Billy Idol by MTV VJ Martha Quinn. This interview was included on the cassette release as well.

== Personnel ==
Musicians

As no musicians are credited on the album sleeve, credits are adapted from Idol's autobiography Dancing With Myself, except where noted.

- Billy Idol – vocals
- Aseley Otten – guitar
- Mick Smiley – bass
- Frankie Banali – drums
- Stephanie Spruill – backing vocals
- Steve New − guitar (track 4)
- Steve Jones − guitar (track 4)
- Danny Kustow − guitar (track 4)
- Tony James – bass (track 4)
- Terry Chimes – drums (track 4)

Technical

- Keith Forsey – producer
- Brian Reeves – engineer
- Nigel Walker – engineer (track 4)
- Brian Aris – photography
- Janet Levinson – design

== Charts ==
Chart performance for Don't Stop
Chart (1981–1983)	Peak position
US Billboard Top LPs & Tape	71
