= Devil's Playground (album) =

Studio album by Billy Idol
- Released: 22 March 2005
- Recorded: 2004
- Genre: Punk rock; hard rock; pop-punk
- Length: 54:28; 58:59 (Japanese edition)
- Label: Sanctuary
- Producer: Keith Forsey

Billy Idol chronology
VH1 Storytellers (2002)	Devil's Playground (2005)	Happy Holidays (2006)

Singles from Devil's Playground
- 1. "Scream" Released: March 2005

Professional ratings
Aggregate scores
Source	Rating
Metacritic	52/100
Review scores
Source	Rating
AllMusic	2/5 stars
Blender	3.5/5 stars
Entertainment Weekly	B−
The Guardian	2/5 stars
Mojo	2.5/5 stars
Now	3/5 stars
Q	3/5 stars
Rolling Stone	3/5 stars
Sputnikmusic	3.0/5
Uncut	2.5/5 stars

Devil's Playground is the sixth studio album by the English rock singer Billy Idol, released on 22 March 2005. It is his first album in over a decade, the last being 1993's Cyberpunk, and his first new songs since 2001, when he covered "Don't You (Forget About Me)" on the compilation album Greatest Hits.

== Background and recording ==
The album saw Idol reunite with guitarist Steve Stevens and producer Keith Forsey in the studio. All songs were written or co-written by Idol except "Plastic Jesus". The album was engineered and mixed by Brian Reeves at the Jungle Room in Los Angeles.

During the recording of the album, the crew of the TV show Bands Reunited ambushed the Jungle Room and tried to convince Billy to reunite with his old band Generation X for a one-night performance, but Idol slammed the door on them, leading to an apology by the crew.

== Release ==
Idol and the band supported the album with a world tour of rock festival appearances in 2005 and 2006, including several performances on the Vans Warped Tour.

The song "Scream" was used in an episode of Viva La Bam, in which Idol also guest starred, where he and Bam Margera sing it as they go down the highway.

== Critical reception ==
Devil's Playground was met with "mixed or average" reviews from critics. At Metacritic, which assigns a weighted average rating out of 100 to reviews from mainstream publications, this release received an average score of 52 based on 11 reviews.

In a review for AllMusic, Stephen Thomas Erlewine wrote: "On this pair of hooky, catchy tunes named after girls, Devil's Playground points toward an interesting, fruitful direction for Idol – one that acknowledges his veteran status without sounding aged – that he hopefully may wind up taking next time out.".

== Track listing ==
All tracks are written by Billy Idol and Brian Tichy except as noted.

Devil's Playground track listing
No.	Title	Writer(s)	Length
1.	"Super Overdrive"		4:18
2.	"World Comin' Down"		3:33
3.	"Rat Race"	Idol, Steve Stevens	4:17
4.	"Sherri"	Idol	3:17
5.	"Plastic Jesus"	Ed Rush, George Cromarty	4:53
6.	"Scream"		4:42
7.	"Yellin' at the Xmas Tree"		4:14
8.	"Romeo's Waiting"	Idol, Stevens	3:42
9.	"Body Snatcher"		3:57
10.	"Evil Eye"		4:32
11.	"Lady Do or Die"		4:37
12.	"Cherie"		3:47
13.	"Summer Running"	Idol, Stevens	4:30

Japan bonus track
No.	Title	Length
14.	"Bleeding Me Insane"	4:31

== Personnel ==
- Billy Idol – vocals
- Steve Stevens – guitar
- Stephen McGrath – bass guitar
- Derek Sherinian – keyboards
- Brian Tichy – percussion, drums
- Julian Beeston – drum programming
- Kevin Anderson – keyboards (uncredited)

== Charts ==
Chart performance for Devil's Playground
Chart (2005)	Peak position
Austrian Albums (Ö3 Austria)	34
Canadian Albums (Nielsen SoundScan)	21
French Albums (SNEP)	105
German Albums (Offizielle Top 100)	15
Italian Albums (FIMI)	51
Scottish Albums (OCC)	75
Swedish Albums (Sverigetopplistan)	40
Swiss Albums (Schweizer Hitparade)	32
UK Albums (OCC)	78
UK Independent Albums (OCC)	13
US Billboard 200	46
