= White Wedding (song) =

1982 single by Billy Idol

Single by Billy Idol

from the album Billy Idol
- A-side: "White Wedding (Parts 1 and 2)"
- B-side: "White Wedding (Part 2)"
- Released: 22 October 1982 (UK)
- Genre: New wave; post-punk
- Length: 4:12 (album version); 3:30 (7-inch version); 8:25 (12-inch version)
- Label: Chrysalis
- Songwriter: Billy Idol
- Producer: Keith Forsey

Billy Idol singles chronology
"Hot in the City" (1982)	"White Wedding" (1982)	"Rebel Yell" (1983)

Music video
- "White Wedding Pt 1" on YouTube

"White Wedding" is a song by the English rock singer Billy Idol that was released as the second single from his eponymous debut studio album in 1982. Although not Idol's highest-charting hit, it is often considered one of his most recognizable songs.

== Background ==
In a 2025 interview, Idol said the song was inspired by his pregnant sister's wedding, often called a "shotgun wedding".

== Reception ==
In the US, "White Wedding" peaked at No. 10 on the Billboard Bubbling Under the Hot 100 chart on 27 November 1982, then reached No. 36 on the Billboard Hot 100 on 2 July 1983 after it was re-issued. In the UK, it reached No. 6 in the UK Singles Chart upon its re-release there on 1 July 1985, when it was re-issued to promote the Vital Idol remix album.

Upon its release, Gavin Martin of the NME was negative in his review, calling it "hopelessly cobbled together" with a "jerky syn-drum, Billy trying to sound aggressive about marriage, and the whole thing thrown off balance with a raunchy Stones guitar riff hammering away in the background". In the US, Cash Box described it as "a powerful entry" whose "ominous guitar intro" and "accusatory tone" command attention.

== Music video ==
The music video, featuring Idol attending a goth wedding, is one of his best-known. The bride is played by Perri Lister, Idol's real-life girlfriend at the time. She is also one of the three dancers clad in black leather, who slap their buttocks in time with the clap track in the song as they shimmy downwards near the end. "That's the kind of thing they love in England", says Idol.

In one scene, Idol forces a wedding ring made of barbed wire onto Lister's finger and cuts her knuckle. Lister insisted that her knuckle actually be cut in order for the scene to appear more realistic. MTV initially removed this scene from the video. Also controversial were the apparent Nazi salutes made by the crowd toward the couple. Director David Mallet says he was merely "playing with the power of crowd imagery" when he had the extras reach toward the bride and did not realize how it looked until after it was filmed.

== Cover version ==
Murderdolls reached number 24 on the UK Singles chart in 2003 with their cover of "White Wedding."

== Track listing ==
=== 1982 release ===
7″: Chrysalis – CHS 2656 (UK)

1. "White Wedding" – 3:30
2. "Hole in the Wall" – 4:14

12″: Chrysalis – CHS 12 2656 (UK)

1. "White Wedding (Parts 1 and 2)" – 8:20
2. "White Wedding" – 3:30
3. "Hole in the Wall" – 4:14

7″: Chrysalis – CHS 2648 (US)

1. "White Wedding" – 3:30
2. "Dead on Arrival" – 3:54

12″: Chrysalis – EPC 5002 (US)

1. "White Wedding (Parts 1 and 2)" – 8:20
2. "White Wedding (Part 2)" – 4:27

=== 1983 release ===
12″: Chrysalis – 4V9 42685 (US)

1. "White Wedding (Parts 1 and 2)" – 8:20
2. "White Wedding (Part 2)" – 4:27

7″: Chrysalis – CHS 42697 (US)

1. "White Wedding" – 3:30
2. "Dead on Arrival" – 3:54

=== 1985 re-issue ===
7″: Chrysalis – IDOL 5 (UK)

1. "White Wedding" – 3:30
2. "Mega-Idol Mix" – 5:34
- 7" Mega-Idol comprises "Flesh for Fantasy" and "Hot in the City"

12″: Chrysalis – IDOLX 5 (UK)

1. "White Wedding Parts I & II (Shot Gun Mix)" – 8:20
2. "Mega-Idol Mix" – 7:50
- 12″ Mega-Idol comprises "Flesh for Fantasy", "Hot in the City" and "Dancing with Myself"

== Charts ==
=== Weekly charts ===
Weekly chart performance for "White Wedding"
Chart (1982–1985)	Peak position
Australia (Kent Music Report)	9
Canada Top Singles (RPM)	1
New Zealand (Recorded Music NZ)	5
UK Singles (Official Charts)	6
US Billboard Hot 100	36
US Dance Club Songs (Billboard)	10
US Mainstream Rock (Billboard)	4

=== Year end charts ===
Year-end chart performance for "White Wedding"
Chart (1983)	Position
Australia (Kent Music Report)	61
Canada Top Singles (RPM)	21
New Zealand (Recorded Music NZ)	11

Chart (1985)	Position
UK Singles (OCC)	58

== Certifications ==
Certifications for "White Wedding"
Region	Certification	Certified units/sales
Canada (Music Canada)	Gold	50,000^{^}
New Zealand (RMNZ)	2× Platinum	60,000^{‡}
United Kingdom (BPI)	Platinum	600,000^{‡}
^{^} Shipments figures based on certification alone.^{‡} Sales+streaming figures based on certification alone.
