= Flesh for Fantasy =

Single by Billy Idol

from the album Rebel Yell
- B-side: "Blue Highway"
- Released: August 1984 (US); 21 September 1984 (UK)
- Recorded: 1983
- Genre: New wave; hard rock; post-punk
- Length: 4:37 (Album version); 3:47 (Single version)
- Label: Chrysalis
- Songwriters: Billy Idol; Steve Stevens
- Producer: Keith Forsey

Billy Idol singles chronology
"Eyes Without a Face" (1984)	"Flesh for Fantasy" (1984)	"Catch My Fall" (1984)

Music video
- "Flesh for Fantasy" on YouTube

Professional ratings
Review scores
Source	Rating
AllMusic	Not rated

"Flesh for Fantasy" is a song by the English rock singer Billy Idol, released in August 1984 as the third single from his second studio album Rebel Yell (1983). It reached No. 5 in New Zealand, No. 11 in Germany, No. 20 in Switzerland, and No. 29 on the US Billboard Hot 100.

== Background and writing ==
The song was written by Billy Idol and Steve Stevens, with its title being inspired by the American anthology film Flesh and Fantasy (1943).

== Composition ==
"Flesh for Fantasy" is a new wave, hard rock and post-punk song, with elements of rock, pop and funk.

== Music video ==
The music video was directed by the American film and television director Howard Deutch. Deutch's contact lenses got stuck in his eyes as a result of long hours and exhaustion.

During filming, Idol and his then-girlfriend Perri Lister had a "terrible fight."

John Diaz described it as the most difficult video he ever produced. Shooting was delayed because the crew was at another video that took longer than expected. The director of photography experienced temporary blindness from exhaustion.

== Spanish version ==
Argentine rock singer-songwriter Miguel Mateos made a Spanish version, titled "Sexo y frenesí", and included it on his second live album Salir Vivo in 2002.

== Charts ==
Weekly chart performance for "Flesh for Fantasy"
Chart (1984)	Peak position
Australia (Kent Music Report)	28
Canada Top Singles (RPM)	11
Italy (Musica e Dischi)	24
New Zealand (Recorded Music NZ)	5
Switzerland (Schweizer Hitparade)	20
UK Singles (Official Charts)	54
US Billboard Hot 100	29
US Mainstream Rock (Billboard)	8
West Germany (Media Control)	11
