= Billy Idol =

English singer (born 1955)

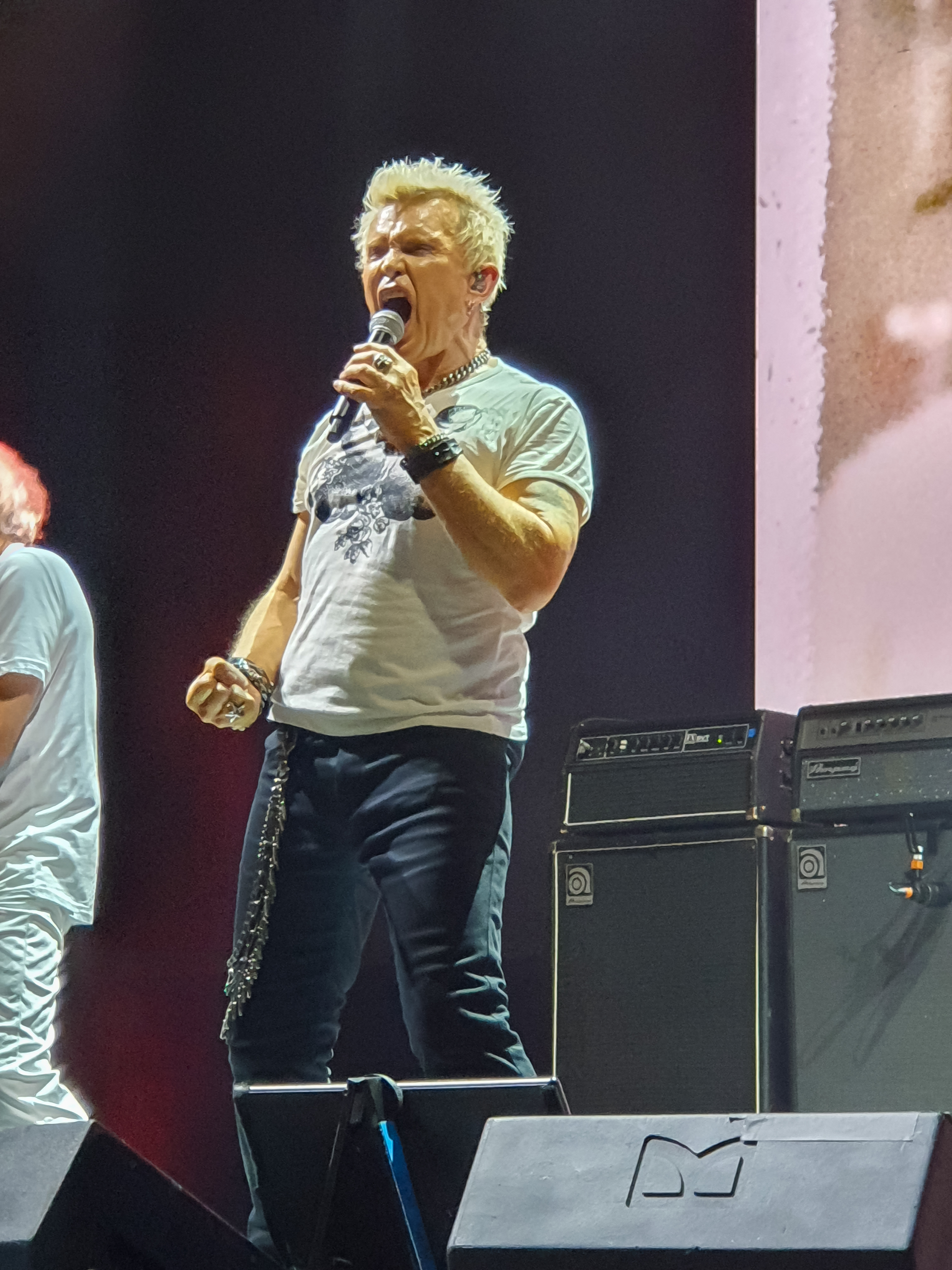
- Idol performing in 2023

Background information
- Born: William Michael Albert Broad; 30 November 1955 (age 70); Stanmore, Middlesex, England
- Genres: Hard rock; new wave; punk rock; pop rock
- Occupations: Singer; songwriter
- Years active: 1976–present
- Labels: Chrysalis; EMI; Sanctuary; BFI; Dark Horse
- Member of: Generation Sex
- Formerly of: Generation X; Chelsea
- Website: billyidol.net

William Michael Albert Broad (born 30 November 1955), known professionally as Billy Idol, is an English rock singer and songwriter. He achieved fame in the 1970s on the London punk rock scene as the lead singer of Generation X. He later embarked on a solo career which led to international recognition and made him a lead artist during the MTV-driven "Second British Invasion" in America.

Idol began his music career in 1976 as a guitarist in the punk rock band Chelsea, but left the group after a few weeks and formed Generation X with his former Chelsea bandmate Tony James. With Idol as lead singer, the band achieved success in the UK and released three studio albums on Chrysalis Records before disbanding. In 1981, Idol moved to New York City to pursue his solo career in collaboration with guitarist Steve Stevens. His debut studio album Billy Idol (1982) was a commercial success, and Idol became a staple of the then-new television channel MTV with the music videos for his singles "Dancing with Myself" and "White Wedding".

Idol's second studio album Rebel Yell (1983) was a major commercial success, featuring hit singles "Rebel Yell" and "Eyes Without a Face". The album was certified double platinum by the Recording Industry Association of America (RIAA) for selling 2 million copies in America, and he then released Whiplash Smile (1986). He released the greatest hits album Idol Songs: 11 of the Best (1988), which went platinum in the UK, and then released Charmed Life (1990) and the concept album Cyberpunk (1993).

Idol spent the second half of the 1990s focusing on his personal life out of the public eye. In 1990, he broke his leg in a motorcycle accident, and later said in his biography Dancing With Myself (2014) that "by the time the motorcycle accident happened, [he] had been living by the credo 'live every day as if it's your last, and one day you're sure to be right'". He made a musical comeback with the release of Devil's Playground (2005) and later released Kings & Queens of the Underground (2014) and Dream Into It (2025). Idol is a three time Grammy Award nominee in the now defunct Best Male Rock Vocal Performance category. In 2023, he received a star on the Hollywood Walk of Fame. Idol and Stevens were inducted into the Rock and Roll Hall of Fame in 2026.

== Early life ==
William Michael Albert Broad was born in Stanmore on 30 November 1955, to Irish housewife Joan (née O'Sullivan) and English salesman William Alfred Broad. His mother was from Cork, his father was from Birmingham. His parents attended Church of England services regularly. In 1958, at the age of two, he moved with his parents to the U.S. and settled in Patchogue, New York; they also lived in Rockville Centre, New York. His younger sister, Jane, was born during this time. The family returned to England four years later and settled in Dorking. In 1971, when Idol was 15, the family moved to Bromley, where he attended Ravensbourne School for Boys. His family later moved to Goring-by-Sea, where he attended Worthing High School for Boys. In October 1975, he began attending the University of Sussex to pursue a Philosophy with Literature degree, but left after year one in 1976. He later joined the Bromley Contingent, a loosely organised gang of Sex Pistols fans who travelled to see the band wherever they played.

== Career ==
=== 1976–1981: Generation X ===
The stage name "Billy Idol" was coined after a chemistry teacher, Bill Price, described Idol as "idle" on his school report card. Idol has stated that he had hated chemistry and underachieved in it. In a 1983 interview, he said of the name, "It was a bit of a goof, but part of the old English school of rock. It was a 'double thing', not just a poke at the superstar-like people... It was fun, you know?" In another interview for BBC Breakfast in October 2014, he said that he wanted to use the name "Billy Idle", but thought the name would be unavailable due to its similarity to the name of Monty Python star Eric Idle and chose Billy Idol instead.

In late 1976, Idol joined the newly formed West London 1960s retro-rock band Chelsea as a guitarist. The act's singer/frontman Gene October styled Idol's image, advising him to use contact lenses instead of eyeglasses for his short sight, and dye his hair blonde with a crew cut for a retro-1950s rocker look. After a few weeks performing with Chelsea, Idol and Tony James, the band's bass guitarist, quit and co-founded Generation X, with Idol switching from guitarist to the role of singer/frontman. Generation X was one of the first punk bands to appear on the BBC Television music programme Top of the Pops. Although a punk rock band, they were inspired by mid-1960s British pop, in sharp contrast to their more militant peers, with Idol stating, "We were saying the opposite to the Clash and the Pistols. They were singing 'No Elvis, Beatles or the Rolling Stones', but we were honest about what we liked. The truth was we were all building our music on the Beatles and the Stones."

In 1977, Idol sang "Your Generation" on the TV series Marc. Generation X signed a recording contract with Chrysalis Records, released three studio albums, performed in the 1980 film D.O.A.: A Rite of Passage, and then disbanded.

=== 1981–1985: Solo career and breakthrough ===
MTV has paved the way for a host of invaders from abroad: Def Leppard, Adam Ant, Madness, Eurythmics, the Fixx and Billy Idol, to name a few. In return, grateful Brits, even superstars like Pete Townshend and the Police, have mugged for MTV promo spots and made the phrase 'I want my MTV' a household commonplace.

— Anglomania: The Second British Invasion, by Parke Puterbaugh for Rolling Stone, November 1983.

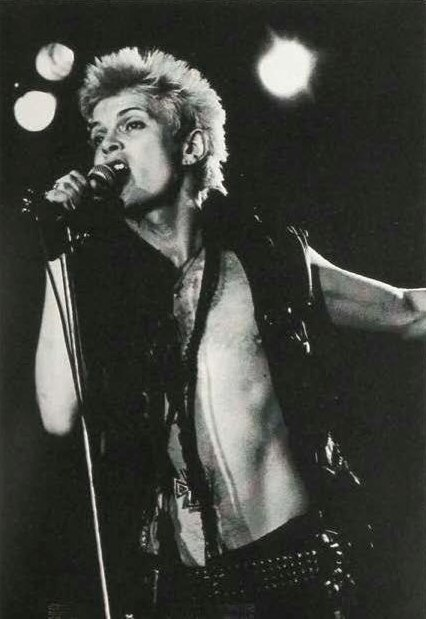
Billy Idol in 1984

Idol moved to New York City in 1981 and became a solo artist, working with former Kiss manager Bill Aucoin. Idol's punk-like image worked well with the glam rock style of his new partner on guitar, Steve Stevens. Together they worked with bassist Phil Feit and drummer Gregg Gerson. Idol's solo career began with the Chrysalis Records EP titled Don't Stop in 1981, which included the Generation X song "Dancing with Myself", originally recorded for their last album Kiss Me Deadly, and a cover of Tommy James and the Shondells' song "Mony Mony". Idol's debut solo album Billy Idol was released in July 1982. The album debuted at number 45 on the Billboard 200 and number 5 in New Zealand.

Part of the MTV-driven "Second British Invasion" of the US in 1982, Idol became an MTV staple with "White Wedding" and "Dancing with Myself". The music video for "White Wedding" was filmed by the British director David Mallet and played frequently on MTV. The motorcycle smashing through the church window stunt was carried out by John Wilson, a London motorcycle courier. In 1983, Idol's label released "Dancing with Myself" in the US in conjunction with a music video directed by Tobe Hooper, which played on MTV for six months.

Rebel Yell (1983), Idol's second LP, was a major success peaking at number 2 in both Germany and New Zealand, while also establishing Idol in the United States with hits such as "Rebel Yell", "Eyes Without a Face", and "Flesh for Fantasy". "Eyes Without a Face" peaked at number four on the US Billboard Hot 100, and "Rebel Yell" reached number six in the UK Singles Chart. "Rebel Yell" also garnered Idol his first Grammy nomination for Best Male Rock Vocal Performance at the 27th Annual Grammy Awards. The record has since been certified platinum by the RIAA, RMNZ, Music Canada and Pro-Música Brasil.

=== 1986–1992: Whiplash Smile and Charmed Life ===
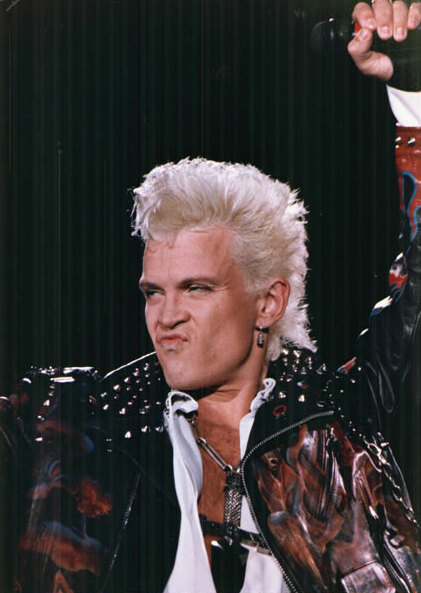
Idol performing during the Cradle of Love Tour, 1990

Idol released Whiplash Smile in 1986, which sold well, charting in the top ten in 9 countries with the highest spot being number 3 in Finland. The album included the hits "To Be a Lover", "Don't Need a Gun" and "Sweet Sixteen". Idol filmed a video for the song "Sweet Sixteen" in Florida's Coral Castle. “To Be a Lover” peaked at number 6 on the Billboard Hot 100, number 3 in both Australia and Finland and number 2 in New Zealand. The song also garnered him another nomination for Best Male Rock Vocal Performance at the 29th Annual Grammy Awards. The album has since been certified platinum in the US, Canada and New Zealand.

A remix album was released in 1987, titled Vital Idol. The album featured a live rendition of his cover of Tommy James' "Mony Mony". In 1987, the single topped the United States chart and reached number 7 in the UK. The following year in 1988 a compilation album titled Idol Songs: 11 of the Best was released, it charted at number 2 in both the UK and Iceland along with reaching number 1 in Finland. It has since gone platinum in multiple countries.

On 6 February 1990 in Hollywood, Idol was involved in a serious motorcycle accident that nearly cost him a leg. He was hit by a car when he ran a stop sign while riding home from the studio one night, requiring a steel rod to be placed in his leg. While he was hospitalised, he vowed to stop wearing clothing featuring the Confederate flag, after a black employee tending to him explained his feelings on it.

Prior to the accident, film director Oliver Stone had chosen Idol for the role of Jim Morrison's drinking pal Cat in his film The Doors (1991), but it prevented him from participating in a major way and Idol's role was reduced to a small part. He was James Cameron's first choice for the role of the villainous T-1000 in Terminator 2: Judgment Day (1991); the role was recast as a result of the accident.

Charmed Life was released in 1990, and continued the commercial success seen in his previous albums, charting in the Top 10 in nine countries along with topping the charts in Finland. The album's first single "Cradle of Love" reached number 2 on the Billboard Hot 100 and was featured in the Andrew Dice Clay film The Adventures of Ford Fairlane. A video for the single was commissioned, but because Idol was unable to walk due to injuries he sustained in a motorcycle accident, director David Fincher shot him from the waist up. The video featured footage of Idol singing in large frames throughout an apartment while a young woman (played by Betsy Lynn George) was trying to seduce a businessman. The video was placed in rotation on MTV and won an award for Best Video from a Film at the 1990 MTV Video Music Awards. "Cradle of Love" also earned Idol a third Grammy nomination for Best Male Rock Vocal Performance. The album has since been certified platinum in the US and Canada. Idol then embarked on a tour in support of the album with Faith No More.

=== 1993–2004: Cyberpunk, decline, and resurgence ===
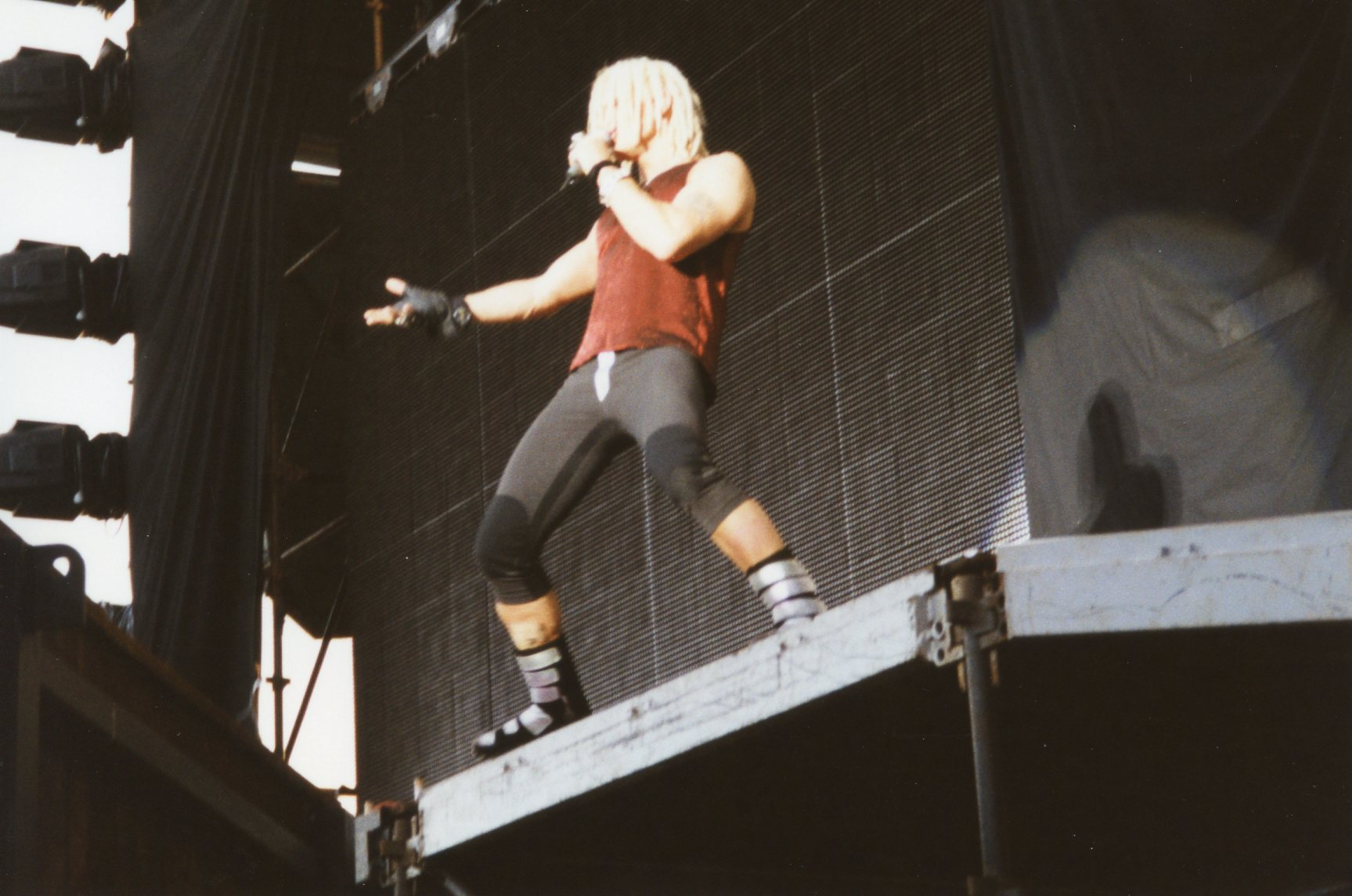
Idol performing at the Milton Keynes Bowl in Buckinghamshire, 1993

In 1993, Idol released Cyberpunk. Regarded as experimental, it was recorded in a home studio using a Macintosh computer. Idol used Studiovision and Pro Tools to record the album. The album took ten months to make. The album did not perform well in the United States and the lead single "Shock to the System" did not chart in the Billboard Hot 100. In comparison, the lead single from Idol's previous album, "Cradle of Love", peaked at No. 2. In Europe, the album fared slightly better, achieving moderate chart success and peaking within the top 20 in 7 countries, along with getting into the top 10 in Austria and Finland. Idol toured in Europe and played a Generation X reunion show in 1993.

He recorded and released the single "Speed" in 1994; the song was featured as the first track in the film soundtrack album. Idol appeared in a 1996 live version of the Who's Quadrophenia. Idol played Lee Turner in the 1996 film Mad Dog Time, he also made a cameo appearance as himself in the 1998 film The Wedding Singer with Adam Sandler, in which Idol played a pivotal role in the plot. The film featured "White Wedding" on its soundtrack. In 2000, he was invited to be a guest vocalist on Tony Iommi's debut solo album. His contribution was on the song "Into the Night", which he co-wrote. That year, he voice acted the role of Odin, a mysterious alien character, in the adult animated science fiction film Heavy Metal 2000, also providing a song for the soundtrack.

VH1 aired Billy Idol – Behind the Music on 16 April 2001. Idol and Stevens took part in a VH1 Storytellers show three days later. The reunited duo set out to play a series of acoustic/storytellers shows before recording the VH1 special. Another Greatest Hits CD was issued in 2001, with Keith Forsey and Simple Minds' "Don't You (Forget About Me)" appearing on the compilation. The LP includes a live acoustic version of "Rebel Yell", taken from a performance at Los Angeles station KROQ's 1993 Acoustic Christmas concert. The Greatest Hits album sold 1 million copies in the United States alone.

In the 2002 NRL Grand Final in Sydney, Idol entered the playing field for the half-time entertainment on a hovercraft to the intro of "White Wedding", of which he managed to sing only two words before a power failure ended the performance.

=== 2005–2009: Devil's Playground ===
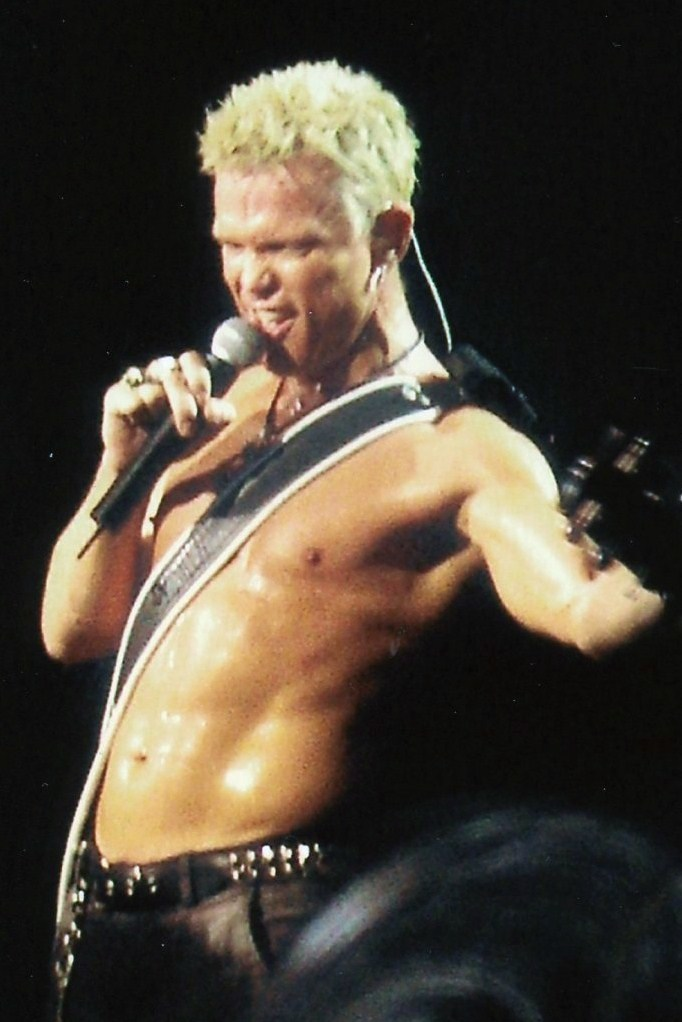
Idol performing on stage at the Brixton Academy in London, 2005

Devil's Playground, which came out in March 2005, was Idol's first new studio album in nearly 12 years. The album reached No. 46 on the Billboard 200 and charted the highest in Germany at number 15. The album included a cover of "Plastic Jesus". Idol played a handful of dates on the 2005 Warped Tour and appeared at the Download Festival at Donington Park, the Voodoo Music Experience in New Orleans, and Rock am Ring. Idol was awarded the comeback of the year at the inaugural Classic Rock Roll of Honour Awards.

In 2006 Idol released a Christmas album titled Happy Holidays it included renditions of many traditional Christmas songs along with 2 original songs.

In 2008, "Rebel Yell" appeared as a playable track on the video game Guitar Hero World Tour and "White Wedding" on Rock Band 2. The Rock Band 2 platform later gained "Mony Mony" and "Rebel Yell" as downloadable tracks. On 24 June 2008, Idol released the greatest hits album The Very Best of Billy Idol: Idolize Yourself. He embarked on a worldwide tour, co-headlining with Def Leppard.

In June 2006, Idol performed at the Congress Theater, Chicago, for the United States television series Soundstage. This performance was recorded and then released on DVD/Blu-ray as In Super Overdrive Live, on 17 November 2009.

=== 2010–2021: Kings & Queens of the Underground ===
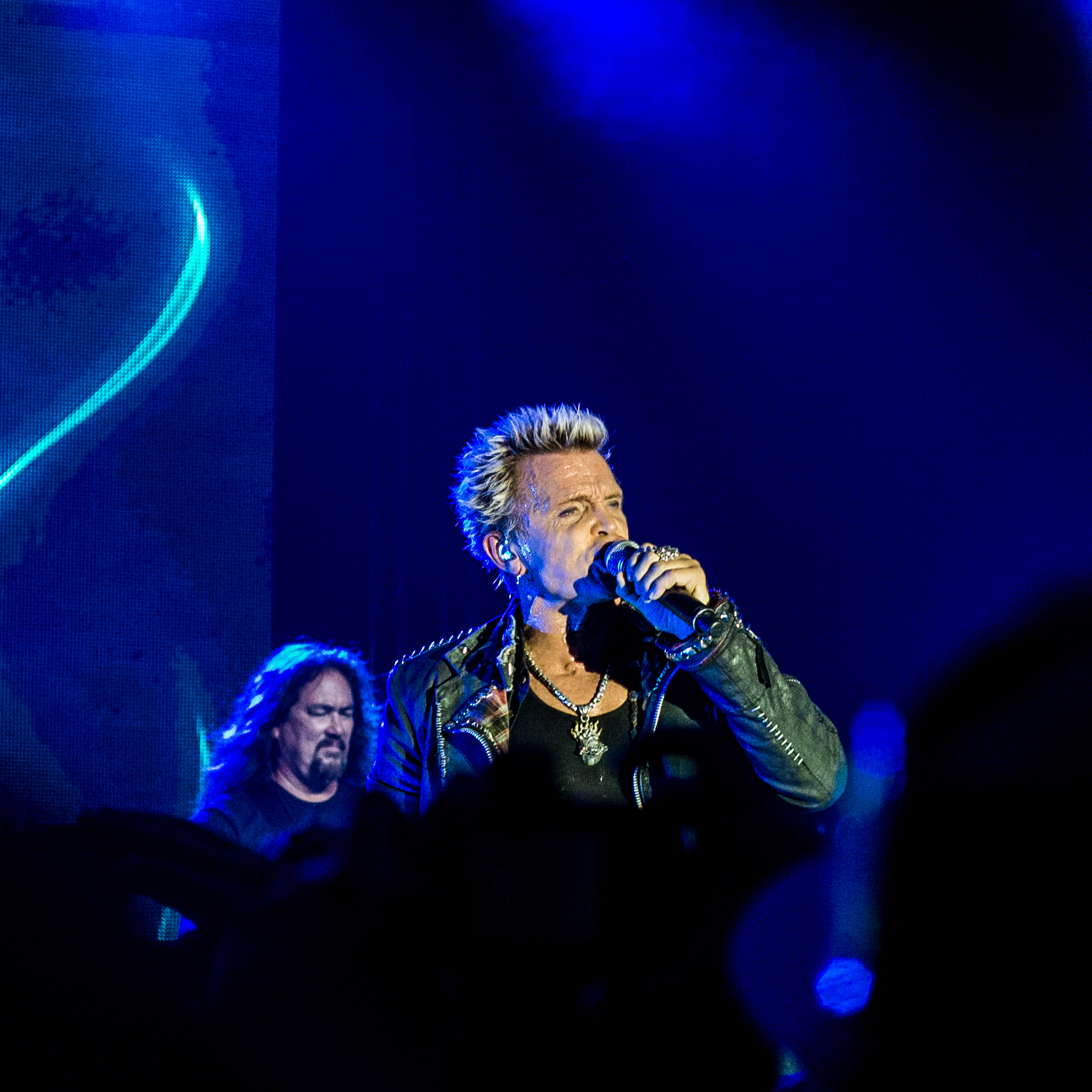
Idol performing live at the Bonnaroo Music Festival in Manchester, Tennessee, 2013

On 16 February 2010, Idol was announced as one of the acts to play at the Download Festival in Donington Park, England. He stated, "With all of these great heavyweight and cool bands playing Download this year, I'm going to have to come armed with my punk rock attitude, Steve Stevens, and all of my classic songs plus a couple of way out covers. Should be fun!" In March 2010, Idol added Camp Freddy guitarist Billy Morrison and drummer Jeremy Colson to his touring line-up.

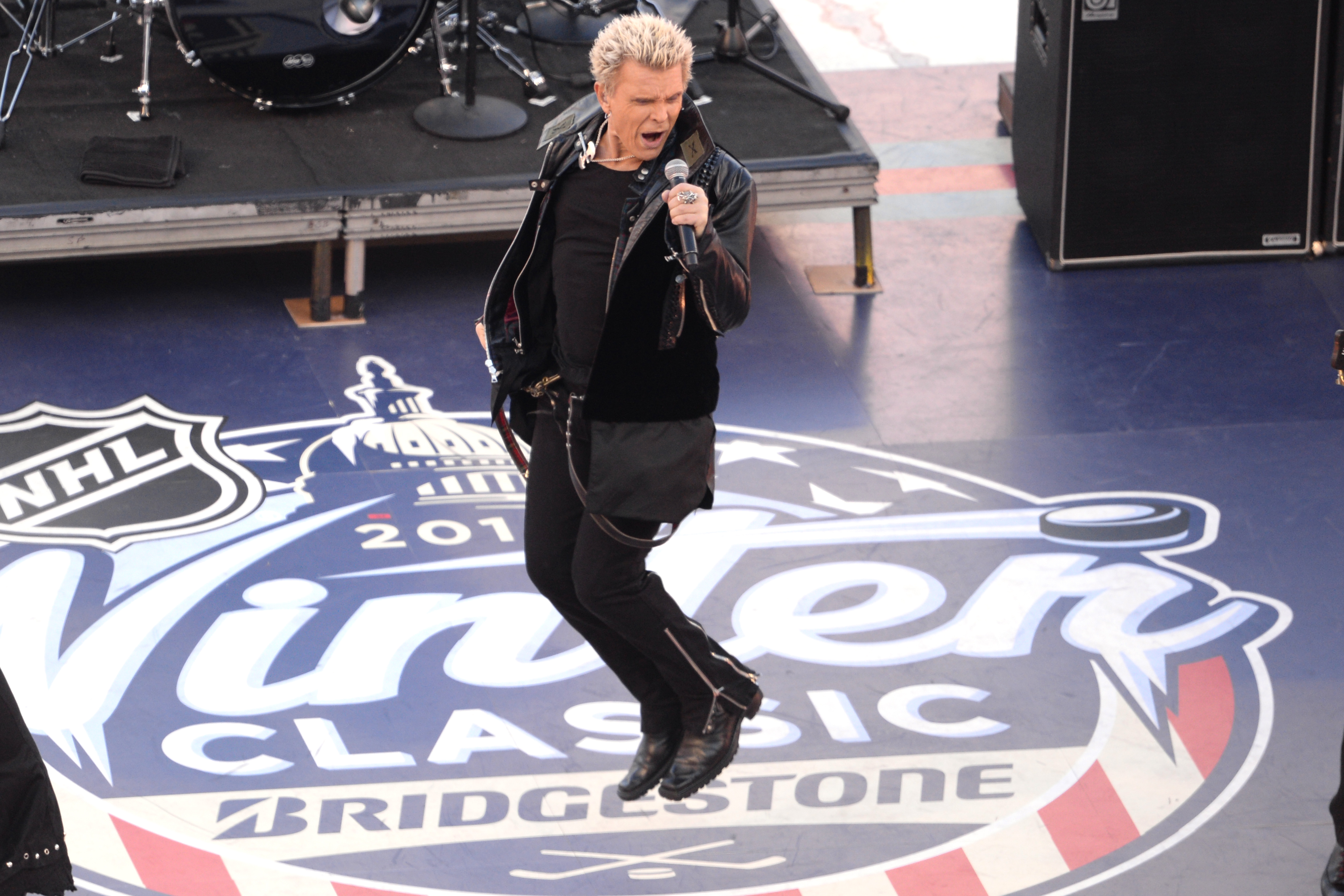
Idol performing live at the 2015 NHL Winter Classic in Washington, D.C.

In 2013, Idol appeared on the third episode of the BBC Four series How the Brits Rocked America. Idol also lent his voice as Spikey Hair Bot to Disney XD's Randy Cunningham: 9th Grade Ninja episode "McSatchle"

In October 2014, Idol released his eighth studio album Kings & Queens of the Underground. It debuted at number 34 on the Billboard 200, and charted in multiple countries in Europe including number 8 in Germany. While recording the album between 2010 and 2014, he worked with producer Trevor Horn, Horn's former Buggles and Yes bandmate Geoff Downes and Greg Kurstin. Idol's autobiography, Dancing with Myself, was published on 7 October 2014 and became a New York Times bestseller.

Idol embarked on a worldwide tour in support of his new album. The tour started on 5 November 2014 and ended 4 April 2015. Over the 40-date tour, Idol with his band performed in Europe, North America and Australia. He continued touring North America in 2016 and 2017.

On 30 October 2018, former Generation X members Idol and Tony James joined with Steve Jones and Paul Cook, former members of another first wave English punk rock band, the Sex Pistols, to perform a free gig at the Roxy in Hollywood, Los Angeles, under the name Generation Sex, playing a combined set of the two former bands' material.

In 2019, Idol went on a co headlining tour alongside Bryan Adams.

In late February 2020, Idol starred in a public service campaign with the New York City Department of Environmental Protection Police titled "Billy Never Idles", intended to fight the unnecessary idling of automobile engines in New York City, to reduce air pollution. Idol teamed with New York Mayor Bill de Blasio to open the campaign, which features Idol saying, "If you're not driving, shut your damn engine off!" and other strong advice. He was a guest vocalist on the song "Night Crawling" from Miley Cyrus' album Plastic Hearts, released in November 2020. In 2016, Idol and Cyrus performed "Rebel Yell" at the iHeartRadio Festival in Las Vegas.

On 12 August 2021, Idol's music video "Bitter Taste", directed by Stephen Sebring, was uploaded to YouTube. Idol announced his new EP The Roadside, which was released on 17 September.

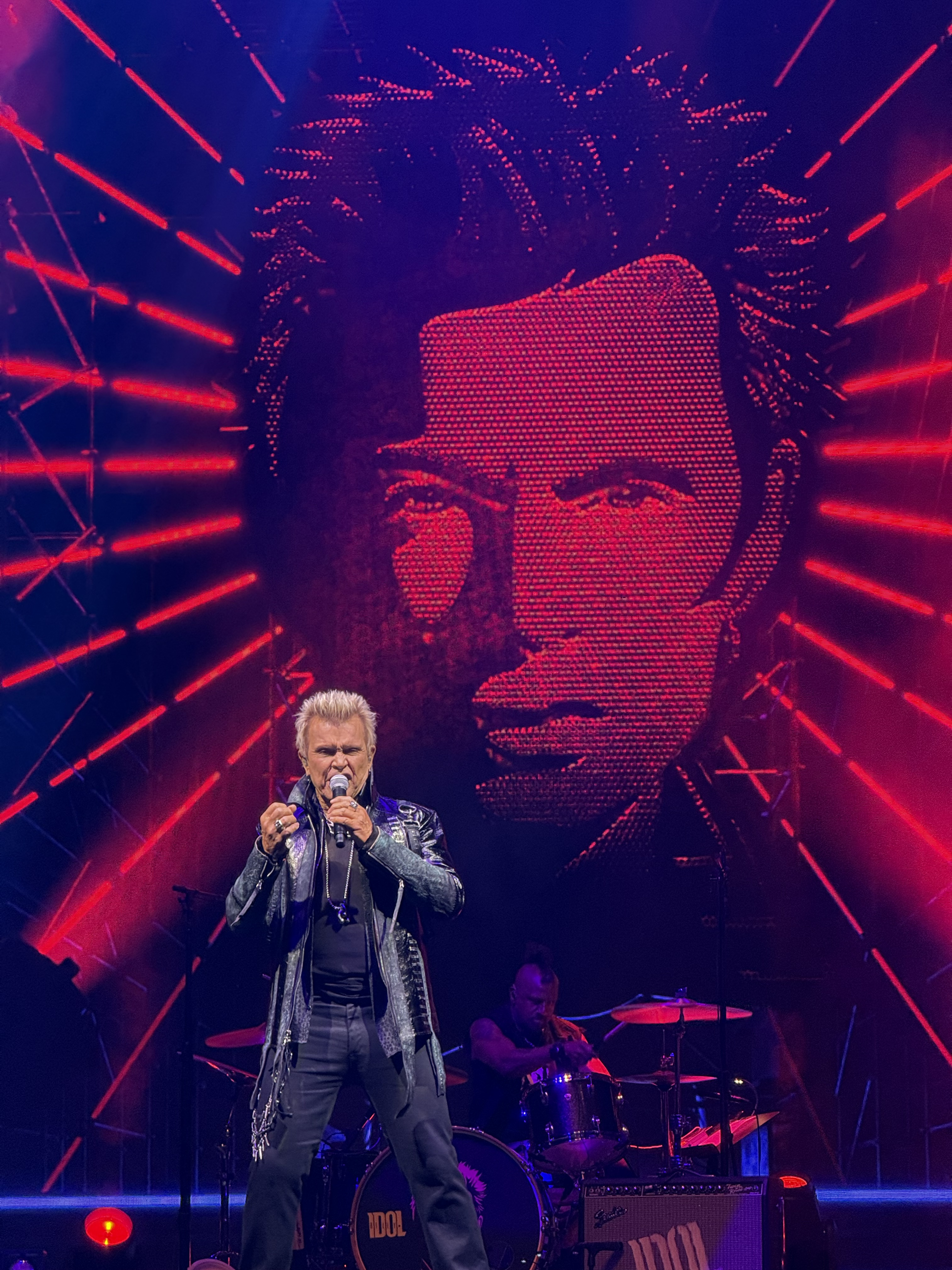
Idol performing in Seattle, WA on September 20, 2025

=== 2022–present: Dream Into It ===
In March 2022, Idol was diagnosed with MRSA, which forced him to cancel a co-headlining tour with Journey. In September that year, he embarked on the postponed Roadside Tour with Killing Joke and Toyah as his UK opening acts in October. American rock band The Foxies opened for him during the EU leg of the tour. Another EP, The Cage, was released on 23 September 2022. A video for the title track, also directed by Sebring, premiered on YouTube 17 August. On 6 January 2023, Idol was honoured with a star on the Hollywood Walk of Fame. On 24 January, he announced a North American tour from late March through mid-May: the tour was to begin in Scottsdale on 30 March and conclude with a concert at the Cruel World Festival on 20 May in Pasadena. In April that year, Idol played the first concert in history at the Hoover Dam. Idol is a member of Generation Sex who are on tour and performed at Glastonbury in 2023.

In 2025, Idol was nominated for induction into the Rock and Roll Hall of Fame for the first time. Idol said Steve Stevens is nominated with him, and they will both be inducted into the Hall should Idol be selected for induction. On 26 February, Idol announced his first studio album in nearly 11 years, Dream Into It, along with its first single, "Still Dancing". The album charted at number 5 in Austria, 3 in Switzerland and number 2 in Germany. The album featured guest appearances from Avril Lavigne, Alison Mosshart and Joan Jett, it received generally positive reception. In April 2025 Idol started his "It's a Nice Day to Tour again" North American tour alongside Joan Jett and the Blackhearts. The European leg of the tour saw him play venues such as Königsplatz with New Model Army as support.

In June 2025, a full-length documentary about Idol premiered at the Tribeca Festival in New York. The film, titled "Billy Idol Should Be Dead," chronicles Idol's rise to fame from his early days with Chelsea and Generation X, his struggles with drug addiction, and his family life from childhood through the present.

In November 2025, ending his Latin-American tour, Idol celebrated his 70th birthday in Mexico City. Dany Villarreal (from The Warning) was invited to the stage for a joint performance of "Dancing With Myself", and later also a mariachi band joined to sing "Las Mañanitas" and "Happy Birthday" dedicated to Idol. On March 1, 2026 it was announced Idol had received his second nomination for the Rock and Roll Hall of Fame.

== Artistry ==
Billy Idol established himself in the late-1970s London punk scene as the frontman of Generation X, a band criticized as too "poppy." AllMusic critic Greg Adams labelled their self-titled debut album as "bubblegum punk", while their second album, Valley of the Dolls has a glam punk sound, influenced by progressive rock, and Bruce Springsteen's mid-1970s work. After renaming to Gen X and going in a more new wave direction on their third album, Kiss Me Deadly, the band released the single "Dancing with Myself", an early example of Idol incorporating dance and pop into his music. The song was a commercial disappointment, and the band disbanded soon after.

The musical style of Idol's solo career is a blend of pop hooks, punk attitude, and dance beats, described as dance-punk, dance-rock, glam punk, glam rock, hard rock, new wave, pop-punk, pop rock, post-punk, and power pop. Rolling Stone critic Johnathan Taylor labelled his debut EP and solo release, Don't Stop, as dance-rock, but on his self-titled debut album, he transitioned to "mainstream power rock" with vocals reminiscent of Bruce Springsteen, Lou Reed and Dave Clark. His second album, Rebel Yell, is a mix of hard rock, new wave and pop, cementing Idol as a "punk-pop star", according to AllMusic critic Matt Collar. He retained this sound into the early 1990s, but experimented with other genres, such as synth-pop in "Eyes Without a Face" (1984) and jazz in "Endless Sleep" (1990).

Idol's biggest change in sound was on Cyberpunk, a techno-rock album based on the cyberdelic subculture of the late 1980s and early 1990s, with synthesised vocals, electronic and industrial elements, looped beats, as well as keyboard riffs. Devil's Playground, his first album in 12 years, has a more hard rock-oriented style, while keeping up with pop-punk bands, such as Green Day and Sum 41. Since then, he's returned to a sound more reminiscent of his 1980s work, combining new wave and hard rock on his two most recent albums, Kings & Queens of the Underground and Dream Into It. The latter is his second concept album, and has elements of soft rock and grunge.

== Personal life ==
Idol lives in Los Angeles. He has never married, but was previously in a long-term relationship with English singer and dancer Perri Lister. They have a son, born 1988, who has been a member of the rock band FIM. They separated in 1989. Idol also has a daughter from another relationship. As of 2026, he has three granddaughters and a grandson. Idol released his memoir Dancing with Myself in 2014. Idol has a love for motorcycles, specifically Harley Davidsons; he even performed at the company's 100th anniversary concert celebration in 2003.

In 2023, Idol revealed he had another son, Brant Broad, after daughter Bonnie took a 23andMe DNA test and learned she had a half-brother. Idol introduced Broad publicly as his son at his Hollywood Walk of Fame induction ceremony that year.

Idol has struggled with alcoholism and drug addiction, including addiction to heroin and cocaine. In his 2014 memoir, he said there was more than one time he woke up in a hospital after passing out in a nightclub. In 1994, he collapsed outside a Los Angeles nightclub due to an overdose of gamma-Hydroxybutyric acid (GHB). He stopped his drug use after this incident, as he decided his children would never forgive him for dying of a drug overdose. Idol then started working out and going to the gym regularly, and has credited it as helping him with his recovery. In a 2025 interview he stated "Working out became a big part of my life. And it helped me get over drug addiction". In 2014, he said he had not taken hard drugs since 2003 but added that he smoked cannabis regularly and was an occasional drinker. In addition to his British citizenship, Idol gained American citizenship in 2018.

Idol's interest in Westerns, Civil War history and other Americana was shared by Ozzy Osbourne, whom Idol helped induct into the Rock & Roll Hall of Fame.

== Live band ==
Idol's live band consists of:

- Billy Idol – lead vocals (1981–present)
- Steve Stevens – lead and rhythm guitar, keyboards, backing vocals (1981–1987, 1993–1995, 1999–present)
- Stephen McGrath – bass, backing vocals (2001–present)
- Billy Morrison – rhythm and lead guitar, backing vocals (2010–present)
- Erik Eldenius – drums (2012–present)
- Paul Trudeau – keyboards, backing vocals (2014–present)

Former members

- Phil Feit – bass (1981–1983)
- Steve Missal – drums (1981–1982)
- Gregg Gerson – drums (1982–1983)
- Judi Dozier – keyboards (1982–1985)
- Steve Webster – bass (1983–1985)
- Thommy Price – drums (1983–1987)
- Kenny Aaronson – bass (1986–1987)
- Susie Davis – keyboards, backing vocals (1986–1987)
- Mark Younger-Smith – guitars, keyboards (1988–1993)
- Phil Soussan – bass (1988–1990)
- Larry Seymour – bass (1990–1996)
- Tal Bergman – drums (1990–1993)
- Bonnie Hayes – keyboards, backing vocals (1990–1991)
- Jennifer Blakeman – keyboards, backing vocals (1993)
- Julie Greaux – keyboards, backing vocals (1993)
- Danny Sadownik – drums (1993)
- Mark Schulman – drums (1993–2001)
- Sasha Krivtsov – bass (2000)
- Brian Tichy – drums (2001–2009)
- Jeremy Colson – drums (2010–2012)
- Derek Sherinian – keyboards (2002–2014)

== Discography ==
- Don't Stop (1981) (Note: Released as a studio EP/mini-album.)
- Billy Idol (1982)
- Rebel Yell (1983)
- Whiplash Smile (1986)
- Charmed Life (1990)
- Cyberpunk (1993)
- Devil's Playground (2005)
- Happy Holidays (2006) (Note: Released as a studio cover album.)
- Kings & Queens of the Underground (2014)
- The Roadside (2021)
- The Cage (2022)
- Dream Into It (2025)

== Awards and nominations ==
ASCAP Pop Music Awards

Year	Nominee / work	Award	Result	Ref.
1991	"Cradle of Love"	Most Performed Song	Won	

Brit Awards

Year	Nominee / work	Award	Result	Ref.
1991	"Cradle of Love"	Best British Video	Nominated	

Classic Rock Roll of Honour Awards

Year	Nominee / work	Award	Result	Ref.
2005	Himself	Comeback of the Year	Won	

Grammy Awards

Year	Nominee / work	Award	Result	Ref.
1985	"Rebel Yell"	Best Male Rock Vocal Performance	Nominated	
1987	"To Be a Lover"	Best Male Rock Vocal Performance	Nominated	
1991	"Cradle of Love"	Best Male Rock Vocal Performance	Nominated	

Hollywood Walk of Fame

Year	Nominee / work	Award	Result	Ref.
2023	Himself	Star	Won	

MTV Video Music Awards

Year	Nominee / work	Award	Result
1984	"Dancing with Myself"	Best Direction	Nominated
1984	"Dancing with Myself"	Best Art Direction	Nominated
1984	"Dancing with Myself"	Best Special Effects	Nominated
1984	"Eyes Without a Face"	Best Cinematography	Nominated
1984	"Eyes Without a Face"	Best Editing	Nominated
1990	"Cradle of Love"	Best Video from a Film	Won
1990	"Cradle of Love"	Best Male Video	Nominated
1990	"Cradle of Love"	Best Special Effects	Nominated
1993	"Shock to the System"	Best Special Effects	Nominated
1993	"Shock to the System"	Best Editing	Nominated

Pollstar Concert Industry Awards

Year	Nominee / work	Award	Result	Ref.
1988	Tour	Most Creative Tour Package	Nominated	

Rock and Roll Hall of Fame

Year	Nominee / work	Award	Result	Ref.
2025	Himself	Hall of Fame	Nominated	
2026	Himself	Hall of Fame	Inducted	

Revolver Magazine

Year	Nominee / work	Award	Result	Ref.
2011	Himself	Revolver Magazine's 100 Greatest Living Rock Stars	Won	

== See also ==
- List of British Grammy winners and nominees
