= Keith Forsey =

English musician (born 1948)

- Born: 2 January 1948 (age 78); London, England
- Genres: Rock, pop
- Occupations: Musician; songwriter; record producer
- Instruments: Drums; percussion
- Years active: 1960s–present
- Labels: RCA Victor; Epic; Casablanca; Hansa; Oasis
- Website: keithforsey.com

Keith Forsey (born 2 January 1948) is an English rock and pop musician and record producer.

== Early life ==
Forsey began his career as a percussionist in the mid-late 1960s as the drummer for The Spectrum and as the drummer in Udo Lindenberg's Panik Orchester until 1976, during which he also played percussion for Amon Düül II. By late 1970s, he was a pioneer of disco, working with artists such as Lipstique, Claudja Barry, La Bionda, the Italo disco pioneers and Boney M. He became Giorgio Moroder's drummer and played on records by Donna Summer, including Bad Girls, Sparks' "No. 1 in Heaven" and Blondie's single "Call Me".

Forsey's own band, Trax, a collaboration with Pete Bellotte, was not as popular. Forsey was influenced by Moroder and began experimenting with electronics and European dance rhythms.

== Production career ==
Like Moroder, Forsey started producing albums himself, and in 1982 produced Billy Idol's solo debut album, Billy Idol and Icehouse's global breakthrough album Primitive Man. Idol's 1983 follow-up, Rebel Yell, went even further, combining Forsey's affection for synthesized pop, Idol's punk grit, and guitarist Steve Stevens' heavy metal sound. 1983 was the year that established Forsey as a producer. He co-wrote "Flashdance...What a Feeling" with Moroder and Irene Cara, who sang the track, for the movie Flashdance. In 1984, the song won an Academy Award. Forsey produced the song "Magic" by Mick Smiley featured on the Ghostbusters soundtrack.

The popularity of Flashdance led to co-writing the song "The Heat Is On" featured on the soundtrack of Beverly Hills Cop, and the titletrack to The NeverEnding Story. Forsey also produced and drummed on The Psychedelic Furs most-acclaimed album, Mirror Moves.

The 1985 hit "Don't You (Forget About Me)" from The Breakfast Club was originally offered to Simple Minds, who declined. After Bryan Ferry, Billy Idol and several other artists passed on the song, Simple Minds reconsidered; their recording went on to top the charts in several countries.

In 1985, Forsey also produced the debut album for the singer Charlie Sexton.

In 1995 Forsey returned to producing Simple Minds, on their album Good News from the Next World.

In 2003, Forsey produced the American guitar pop band Rooney. 2005 saw his return to Billy Idol, producing Devil's Playground.
