= Generation X discography =

- Studio albums: 4
- EPs: 3
- Live albums: 3
- Compilation albums: 6
- Singles: 11

This is the discography of British punk rock band Generation X.

== Albums ==
=== Studio albums ===
Title	Album details	Peak chart positions
Title	Album details	UK
Generation X	Released: 17 March 1978; Label: Chrysalis; Formats: LP, MC, 8-track	29
Valley of the Dolls	Released: 26 January 1979; Label: Chrysalis; Formats: LP, MC	51
Kiss Me Deadly	Released: 23 January 1981; Label: Chrysalis; Formats: LP, MC; Credited as Gen X	—
K.M.D. – Sweet Revenge	Released: 14 April 1998; Label: Empty; Formats: CD, LP; Recorded in 1979	—
"—" denotes releases that did not chart or were not released in that territory.

=== Live albums ===
Title	Album details
Live at the Paris Theatre '78 & '81	Released: March 1999; Label: BBC; Formats: CD; Recorded on 5 May 1978 & 7 January 1981
Live at Sheffield	Released: 5 May 2003; Label: Empty; Formats: CD; Recorded 8 December 1978
Live	Released: 20 June 2005; Label: EMI; Formats: CD; Recorded on 13 December 1980

=== Compilation albums ===
Title	Album details
The Best of Generation X	Released: November 1985; Label: Chrysalis; Formats: LP, MC
The Original Generation X	Released: 1987; Label: MBC; Formats: LP
The Idol Generation	Released: 1990; Label: Castle Communications; Formats: CD, MC; Australia-only release
Perfect Hits 1975–81	Released: October 1991; Label: Chrysalis; Formats: CD, MC
Radio 1 Sessions	Released: 26 November 2002; Label: Strange Fruit; Formats: CD
Anthology	Released: 25 February 2003; Label: EMI; Formats: 3xCD

== EPs ==
Title	Album details	Peak chart positions
Title	Album details	UK
Perfect Hits	Released: 1977; Label: Self-released; Formats: 7"	—
Perfect Hits Vol 2	Released: 1977; Label: Self-released; Formats: 7"	—
Gen X	Released: January 1981; Label: Chrysalis; Formats: 7", 12"	60
"—" denotes releases that did not chart.

== Singles ==
Title	Year	Peak chart positions		Album
Title	Year	UK	IRE	Album
"Your Generation" (white label release) b/w "Listen"	1977	—	—	Non-album singles
"Your Generation" (different recording) b/w "Day by Day"	1977	36	—	Non-album singles
"Wild Youth" b/w "Wild Dub"	1977	—	—	Non-album singles
"Ready Steady Go" b/w "No No No"	1978	47	—	Generation X
"King Rocker" b/w "Gimme Some Truth"	1979	11	20	Valley of the Dolls
"Valley of the Dolls" b/w "Shakin' All Over"	1979	23	—	Valley of the Dolls
"Friday's Angels" b/w "Trying for Kicks"/"This Heat"	1979	62	—	Valley of the Dolls
"Dancing with Myself" (as Gen X) b/w "Ugly Rash"	1980	60	—	Kiss Me Deadly
"Untouchables" (as Gen X; promo-only release) c/w "Dancing with Myself"	1981	—	—	Kiss Me Deadly
"Day by Day" (Live; Germany-only limited release) b/w "Paramoid"	2004	—	—	Live at Sheffield
"Your Generation" (Winstanley Mix) b/w "Trying for Kicks" (Winstanley Mix)	2019	—	—	Non-album single
"—" denotes releases that did not chart or were not released in that territory.

== See also ==
- Billy Idol discography
