= Generation X (disambiguation) =

Generation X is the demographic cohort (born 1965–1980) following baby boomers.

Generation X may also refer to:

- Generation X (1964 book), a book on popular youth culture by Charles Hamblett and Jane Deverson
- Generation X (band), a 1970s/1980s punk band fronted by Billy Idol
  - Generation X (album), an album by the band
- Generation X: Tales for an Accelerated Culture, a 1991 novel by Douglas Coupland
- Generation X (comics), a comic book series published by Marvel Comics
  - Generation X (film), a 1996 television film based on the comics
- D-Generation X, a World Wrestling Entertainment professional wrestling stable
- "X Generation", a song by Pennywise from the album All or Nothing
- The tenth generation of the Pokémon series, see List of generation X Pokémon.

== See also ==
- Generation Y (disambiguation)
