= Mark Laff =

English drummer

- Born: Mark Red Laffoley; 19 May 1958 (age 68); Chipping Barnet, England
- Origin: Finchley, London, England
- Genres: Punk rock, post-punk, rockabilly
- Occupation: Drummer
- Years active: 1976–2004, 2007, 2019, 2025

Mark Laff (born Mark Red Laffoley; 19 May 1958) is an English retired drummer who was a member of several rock bands, including Generation X.

== Early life and career ==
Mark Red Laffoley was born on 19 May 1958 at Barnet General Hospital, at Chipping Barnet in the County of Hertfordshire.

He began playing drums as a teenager, being influenced by England's 1960s Mod fashion and music movement and the work of Keith Moon. After a failed audition for The Clash (he was one of two drummers to get a call back), his first drumming role was with Subway Sect, sharing the bill with the Sex Pistols, The Clash, and Siouxsie and the Banshees for the Anarchy and White Riot tours, however he left the band shortly afterwards.

== Generation X ==
In April 1977, the 18-year-old Laff was recruited as a replacement drummer for the punk rock band Generation X, a few months before it signed to Chrysalis Records and released its first single, "Your Generation". He was Generation X's drummer through its two albums, the self-titled Generation X (1978), followed by Valley of the Dolls (1979); which saw the band amidst a heavy performance schedule across Great Britain gaining momentum, drawing recognition and impacting the British pop music charts with its releases. Jethro Tull's drummer Clive Bunker also played on the Valley of the Dolls album as a session musician. Bunker and Laff played together on the tracks, achieving a distinctive double-drum sound. However, after the relative commercial failure of the Valley of the Dolls, internal disagreements about the band's musical direction and personality clashes within it came to a head in late 1979, during the recording of its abortive third long-player (which would be released retrospectively 20 years later under the title K.M.D. - Sweet Revenge). Lead guitarist Bob "Derwood" Andrews quit the band in December 1979, followed by Laff in January 1980, when he was asked to leave after a disagreement with the act's frontman/singer Billy Idol and bass player Tony James over song-writing credits for the band's recorded work. With Laff and Andrews' departure, Generation X essentially came to an end; a re-branded act, Gen X, with a replacement guitarist and drummer subsequently launched by Idol and James went on to fail commercially, and was gone by early 1981.

== Empire ==
After leaving Generation X, Laff and Andrews played together as session musicians on Jimmy Pursey's solo album, Imagination Camouflage. In mid-1980 they set up a new band entitled Empire, recruiting bassist Simon Bernal to complete the line-up. A single entitled "Hot Seat" was released, followed by a musically influential but commercially unsuccessful album titled Expensive Sound. The trio undertook four gigs before Bernal left. After a number of line-up changes of personnel and more concerts, but little commercial success, Laff left Empire's line-up in February 1983, and band was ended by Andrews in 1984.

== Twenty Flight Rockers ==
In 1985 Laff founded a new retro rock & roll/rockabilly band called Twenty Flight Rockers with the singer/frontman Gary Twinn. The band released via ABC Records the single "Tower Block Rock" (1985) (ranked number 31 for Best Single of that year by Rockerilla magazine, but making no impact on the UK Singles Chart), and another single "Johnny 7" via WEA Records in 1986, which was also a commercial failure. In March 1986 the band released the song "Searching for a Hero" in cassette format on a compilation album advertising new bands titled Spools Gold, given away free with the Record Mirror. Bernie Rhodes, who Laff knew back from his early days with Subway Sect was hired to manage them, and arranged the signing of the band with Epic Records.

The band recorded a series of sessions, and a self-produced studio album Ride, which was scheduled for commercial release in 1988, however Epic Records in the meantime was bought out by Sony, which subsequently opted to drop the band from the label, leading to Twenty Flight Rockers breaking up.

The Ride L.P. would not see release until 2001 when it was put out by Revel Yell Music as a retrospective release under the title Twenty Flight Rockers. In 2004 Revel Yell released a second retrospective album from the band, Twenty Flight Rockers – The New York Sessions 1988.

== Later career ==
On 20 September 1993, during Billy Idol's 'No Religion' tour, Laff played with a re-formed Generation X in a reunion concert at the Astoria Theatre in London's West End.

In 2006 Laff re-recorded the song "Hot Seat" with Derwood Andrews to commemorate the 25th anniversary of the release of Empire's Expensive Sound, which was re-released on the Expansive Sound Volume II compilation album.

Laff briefly reunited with Vic Godard in 2007 to re-record Subway Sect's previously unreleased debut album under the title 1978 Now.

In 2019, Laff joined the touring line-up of LAMF, a band fronted by Walter Lure of The Heartbreakers which also featured Mick Rossi, former guitarist of Slaughter & The Dogs. This band played several gigs, including an appearance at the Rebellion Festival in Blackpool.

In 2025, he assembled a band named X Generation X, which toured across the United Kingdom in November of that year.

On July 24, 2026, Twenty Flight Rockers announced their return for a London show at the 100 Club on October 30, with tickets going on sale on July 27. They also revealed an archive live release of Live '85, a concert originally recorded at The Bull in East Sheen from July 1985.

== Post-music career ==
Laff semi-retired from professional music in 2004, and went into business as the director of a holistic lifestyle therapy company in Brighton in East Sussex.

== Discography ==
Generation X

- 1978 – Generation X (Chrysalis Records)
- 1979 – Valley of the Dolls (Chrysalis Records)
- 1998 – Sweet Revenge (Empty Records) (Originally recorded in 1979.)
- 2004 – K.M.D. – Sweet Revenge Xtra (Revel Yell Music) (Featuring bonus tracks.)

Generation X Compilations

- 1985 – The Best of Generation X (Chrysalis Records)
- 1990 – The Idol Generation (Castle Communications) (Australia only.)
- 1991 – Perfect Hits 1975–81 (Chrysalis Records)
- 1999 – Live at the Paris Theatre '78 & '81 (EMI Records) (Reissued (and edited) in 2002 as One Hundred Punks – BBC Live in Concert.)
- 2002 – Radio 1 Sessions (Strange Fruit Records)
- 2003 – Anthology (EMI Records)
- 2003 – Live at Sheffield (Empty Records)

Empire

- 1981 – Expensive Sound (Dinosaur Discs) (American reissue in 1986 by Highway 61 Records)
- 2003 – Expensive Sound (Poorly Packaged Products) (Featuring bonus tracks.)
- 2009 – Expansive Sound Volume II (Poorly Packaged Products)

Twenty Flight Rockers

- 2001 – Twenty Flight Rockers (Revel Yell Music) (Originally recorded in 1988 as Ride.)
- 2004 – Twenty Flight Rockers – The New York Sessions 1988 (Revel Yell Music)
- 2026 – Live '85 (MR Records) (Originally recorded in July 6, 1985.)
- 2026 - Cool Baby EP (Cadiz Music)

Subway Sect

- 2007 – 1978 Now (Overground Records)

Subway Sect Compilations

- 1999 – Twenty Odd Years – The Story Of... (Motion Records)
- 2011 – Live and Rare Vol 1 (Gnu Inc. Recordings)
- 2012 – Live and Rare Vol 2 (Gnu Inc. Recordings)
