= Bob Andrews (guitarist) =

British rock guitarist

Bob Derwood Andrews
- Also known as: Derwood, Derwood Andrews, Bob Andrews, Robert Andrews
- Born: Robert Ian Andrews; 17 June 1959 (age 67); Fulham, London, England
- Genres: Rock, punk rock, pop punk, post-punk, indie rock, rockabilly, blues, alternative country
- Occupations: Musician, guitarist
- Instrument: Guitar
- Years active: 1976–present

Robert Ian Andrews (born 17 June 1959) is a British rock guitarist, and former member of the bands Generation X, Empire and Westworld.

== Early life ==
Andrews was born in Fulham, England, on 17 June 1959, the son of a mother who was a secretary, and a West London cobbler father. He began to play the guitar at the age of 10, being musically influenced particularly by the work of the British blues rock guitarist Paul Kossoff and Rory Gallagher, and in his youth also rode in junior Motorcycle Speedway competitions in West London. On leaving school at 16, he spent a year as an assistant gardener at Kensington Palace.

== Generation X ==
In late 1976, Andrews was playing lead guitar, his preferred instrument being the Fender stratocaster, with an amateur rocker band called Paradox. Whilst performing at a gig at the Fulham Arts Centre he was talent-spotted by the punk-rocker Billy Idol, who was at that time looking for a guitar player to complete the line-up of a new band that he had just formed that would be named Generation X. Andrews was recruited to be its lead guitarist, in the process freeing Idol from the band's guitar role to become its frontman/singer. Andrews was subsequently christened with the punk pseudonym "Derwood" by the band, a name invented on the spur of the moment by a friend of his whilst under interrogation from Tony James, the band's strategist, about school nicknames that Andrews had in search of a punk stage-name, to avoid James discovering and using the name "Dobbin", which Andrews' prominent front teeth in his school years had attracted. After less than a week, and a handful of rehearsals, Andrews took the stage for the band's first gig, at the Central London College of Art & Design on 10 December 1976.

The band subsequently signed a recording contract with Chrysalis Records and released its first single, "Your Generation", in September 1977, which went to No. 36 in the UK Singles Chart. Andrews remained with the band through their two long-players, the self-titled Generation X (1978), which reached No. 29 in the UK Albums Chart, followed by Valley of the Dolls (1979).

After two propitious opening years, with a hectic touring schedule and record releases entering the charts, the release of the Valley of the Dolls LP at the start of 1979, although being marked simultaneously by their highest chart hit with the single "King Rocker" (No. 11 in the UK Singles Chart), initiated the beginning of a deterioration in the commercial success of the band, and differences began to surface within it between Andrews and Billy Idol and the bass player Tony James as to its future musical direction. The disagreement about direction was augmented by Idol and James' refusal to allow Andrews to contribute to their songwriting partnership, and an increasing personal antipathy that had developed in Andrews towards Idol. In May 1979, Andrews warned them that he was increasingly feeling like leaving Generation X, which was avoided by focusing on the band's first international tour in Japan mid-year, but on returning to England, during the recording sessions for the band's abortive third album (which would be released retrospectively 20 years later, by Andrews in the face of opposition from Idol, under the title K.M.D. – Sweet Revenge) internal disputes came to a head, and Andrews quit the band just before Christmas. He would be joined by the band's drummer Mark Laff a month later, who Idol and James asked to leave over another disagreement.

== Empire ==
In early 1980, Andrews and Laff recorded as session musicians on Jimmy Pursey's first solo album Imagination Camouflage (1980) (Andrews receiving co-writing credit for two of the LP's songs, "Freak Show" and "Situation's Vacant"), before in mid-1980 Andrews and Laff with the bassist Simon Bernal formed the three man post-punk band Empire, with Andrews as the act's lead vocalist. Empire released via the new label Dinosaur Discs, backed by a record shop of the same name at No. 17 Barons Court Road in West Kensington, the song "Hot Seat" (1981), with a B-side entitled "All These Things", which failed to enter the UK Singles Chart. A long-player entitled Expensive Sound (1981), recorded without a producer at Alvic Studios in Barons Court, also failed to enter the UK Album Chart. The band played a handful of gigs around London before Bernal left. After an unstable line-up and some more gigging in 1981–1982, Laff left the act in February 1983 in frustration with its lack of apparent commercial development.

In early 1983, Andrews renamed the act New Empire after recruiting the vocalist Babel Wallace, Mike Gregovich (one of the sound engineers at Alvic Studios who had recorded the band's Expensive Sound LP) playing bass, and Crispin Taylor on the drums. The new line-up released a white label 12" titled "Inside You", and toured in the UK in 1983 as a support act to John Miles and Roman Holliday, and also in Spain, where it found some unanticipated and mysteriously caused popularity with well attended shows. However, without a record label's support, New Empire's increasingly adverse financial circumstances led to Andrews ending it in February 1984 at a gig at the Thames Hall in Slough, Berkshire; Andrews signaling the defeat by wrecking his amp with his guitar in the band's final performance. (A retrospective album of New Empire material would be released in the United States 24 years later entitled Expansive Sound (2009)).

Despite its lack of commercial success, Empire was an influential band in the development of the emo music genre in the United States, and an acknowledged key influence via songs such as "Him or Me" (1981) on the development of the sound of The Stone Roses from the Manchester scene of the late 1980s.

The Expansive Sound LP was commercially re-issued in the United Kingdom in 1986. In the United States, it was re-issued in 2003 by the label Poorly Packaged Products as a double album containing seven previously unreleased studio recordings by the band and live performance material, and in 2014 a limited run collector's edition of the original record and sleeve artwork was released by Drastic Plastic Records.

== Westworld ==
In 1986 Andrews formed a retro-1950s Americana style "beatbox rock'n'roll"/rockabilly surf music garage band called Westworld, with the singer Elizabeth Westwood and the guitarist/drummer Nick Burton. It had an early hit with its debut single "Sonic Boom Boy", which reached No. 11 in the UK Singles Chart in February 1987, which was subsequently commercially used as a backing music track by Sony for one of its television product advertising campaigns.

Between 1986 and 1990 the band performed as a trio utilizing a drum machine and sequencers with two guitarists, Andrews (lead), Burton (rhythm), fronted by Westwood as the singer, and commercially released in the United Kingdom via R.C.A. six singles, five of which entered the top 80 of the UK Singles Chart: Sonic Boom Boy (1987), Ba-Na-Na-Bam-Boo (1987), Where the Action Is (1987), Silvermac (1987), and Everything Good is Bad (1988). A long-player entitled 'Where the Action Is' reached No. 49 in the UK Albums Chart in September 1987. Due to the band's declining chart success R.C.A. dropped its contract, with the band's final U.K. release, the rip-roaring Dance On (which would be Andrews' career parting shot to the United Kingdom's commercial charts) reaching No. 92 in the UK Singles Chart in June 1989. Andrews departed from England with Westwood to live in the United States in 1992, where they released two further singles and two long-players in the U.S. market via an independent label, but without commercial success, and they ended the Westworld act in 1994. A retrospective LP of material from Westworld, entitled Sick Cool, recorded between 1992 and 1994, was released commercially in the United States in 2018.

== Moondogg ==
In 1994, Andrews with Elizabeth Westwood came back to live in London from the U.S. and set up a new experimental Electronic pop/rock act entitled 'Moondogg', working in collaboration with Martin Lee Stephenson in a Hoxton recording studio. The act released several records over the next decade, published by varying small labels in the United Kingdom, U.S. and Japan without impacting any commercial charts. A single entitled 'Wonderfool' (1995) was first released, followed by a long-player entitled Fat Lot of Good (1996) carrying a commercially counterintuitive cover art image. The album was supported by the release of an E.P. titled 'Silver Lining', and the singles 'Black Pain' (1996), and 'Nothing's Sacred' (1996). Another L.P. entitled God's Wallop was recorded in London in the mid-1990s (before Andrews and Westwood quit London and returned to the U.S.), with Rat Scabies playing the drum tracks, produced by Martin Lee Stephenson, but it wasn't commercially released until 2001. A third LP, entitled All the Love in the World (2004), self-produced by Andrews, was recorded by the act at Studio Dee in Los Angeles with a session drummer, and was commercially released in the U.S.

== Speedtwinn ==
In 1996 Andrews joined a provisional new London band consisting of Glenn Matlock, Rat Scabies and Gary Twinn called Dead Horse, but the act failed to develop beyond some rehearsals and a demo recording session, after Matlock abandoned it to join the reformation of the Sex Pistols. From this line-up, Andrews and the vocalist Gary Twinn formed a hybrid British-American alternative country act entitled Speedtwinn, which they relocated to Joshua Tree, California in 1998, combining British rock music from the 1970s with American country music. After gigging in small venues in the area, and recording music videos of cover songs ranging from T-Rex to Johnny Cash, they wrote and commercially released in the United States a self-produced album entitled California (2003), which failed to enter the U.S. charts. Speedtwinn disbanded soon afterwards.

== Derwood and the Rat ==
In Sept 2022, Andrews released a 12-song album, a collaboration with Damned drummer Rat Scabies entitled Derwood and the Rat.

== Solo works – Tone Poet ==
In 2007, Andrews released a solo rock music album entitled Tone Poet (2007). He subsequently recorded and released Cover Yer Arse (2010), a compilation album of cover songs. In 2013, he released a downloadable song, "Sleeping Beauty" from Tone Poet Vol. I.

In 2013, Andrews switched from the electric guitar to playing the lap steel guitar, and subsequently released an American blues album entitled Tone Poet, Vol. II (2014), and toured the British Isles performing music from it in 2015, with 'Sean & Zander' as co-headliners. He also released a song entitled "Winter Pt 1", which was part of an unreleased album entitled Mojave Full Circle. He released two more American blues albums in 2016–2018, entitled Tone Poet Vol. 3 (2016) and Tone Poet Vol.4 (2018). In 2019 Andrews released a compilation long-player of the Tone Poet series, paradoxically entitled Smash Hits (2019), with an introduction to the material written by Henry Rollins.

== Reunions ==
On 20 September 1993, Andrews performed in a late-1970s Generation X line-up reunion at the Astoria Theatre in London's West End.

In 2006, Andrews and Laff re-recorded the Empire single "Hot Seat" for the 25th anniversary of the release of Expansive Sound LP, which was commercially released on the Expansive Sound Volume II (2009) compilation. In 2011, Andrews played again with New Empire's ex-singer Babel Wallace for the recording of a song called "Bed Head" for Wallace's solo album, Good Things Can Happen.

== Influence ==
Andrews has been cited as an influence by guitarists Johnny Marr of The Smiths, and John Squire of The Stone Roses, and his song back-catalogue has been covered by a diverse range of bands, including the U.S. Bombs and the L.A. Guns.

== Personal life ==
Andrews relocated from England to Cave Creek, Arizona, United States of America in 1992. He subsequently moved to Los Angeles, where he dropped out of professional music for a period and worked as a motorcycle courier in the mid-late 1990s, during which time he married Stephanie in Hollywood. In the early 2000s, he moved to California's High Desert region.

== Discography ==
=== Studio albums ===
Generation X

- 1978 – Generation X (Chrysalis Records) UK No. 29
- 1979 – Valley of the Dolls (Chrysalis Records) UK No. 51
- 1979 – K.M.D. – Sweet Revenge (unreleased until 1998, reissued in 2003 as second disc for the Generation Xbox-set).
- 2004 – K.M.D. – Sweet Revenge Xtra (Revel Yell Music) (Featuring bonus tracks.)

Generation X Compilations

- 1985 – The Best of Generation X (Chrysalis Records)
- 1990 – The Idol Generation (Castle Communications) (Australia only.)
- 1991 – Perfect Hits 1975–81 (Chrysalis Records)
- 1999 – Live at the Paris Theatre '78 & '81 (EMI Records) (Reissued (and edited) in 2002 as One Hundred Punks – BBC Live in Concert.)
- 2002 – Radio 1 Sessions (Strange Fruit Records)
- 2003 – Anthology (EMI Records)
- 2003 – Live at Sheffield (Empty Records)

Empire

- 1981 – Expensive Sound (Dinosaur Discs) (American reissue in 1986 by Highway 61 Records).
- 2003 – Expensive Sound (Poorly Packaged Products Records) (Also featuring 7 previously unreleased songs and 4 live cuts).
- 2009/2012 – Volume II – Expansive Sound (Poorly Packaged Products Records) (the never issued before New Empire tracks, plus covers and live cuts from 1983 to 1984).

Westworld

- 1987 – Where the Action Is (RCA Records) UK No. 49
- 1987 – Rockulator (RCA Records) (US release of Where the Action Is with different track listing and artwork and some new mixes).
- 1988 – Beatbox Rock 'N' Roll (RCA Records) (not released in the UK).
- 1991 – Movers and Shakers (MCA Records) (not released in the UK).
- 1997 – Beatbox Rock 'N' Roll (Camden Records) (Compilation album, not to be confused with the same-titled second album).
- 2018 – Sick Cool (Rubbercheese Music) (retrospective release of material recorded in 1992–1994).

Moondogg

- 1996 – Fat Lot of Good (Better Records)
- 2001 – God's Wallop (D.O.R.)
- 2004 – All the Love in the World (Rubbercheese Music)

Speedtwinn

- 2003 – California (Orange Recordings)

=== Solo records ===
- 2007 – Tone Poet, Vol. 1 (Rubbercheese Music) (Digital download only.)
- 2010 – Cover Yer Arse (Main Man Records)
- 2014 – Tone Poet, Vol. 2 (Rubbercheese Music)
- 2016 – Tone Poet, Vol. 3 (Rubbercheese Music) (Digital download only.)
- 2018 – Tone Poet, Vol. 4 (Rubbercheese Music) (Digital download only.)
- 2019 – Smash Hits ('Tone Poet' compilation) (Rubbercheese Music).
- 2022 - Spaceman (Single) (Rubbercheese Music)
