= Live (Generation X album) =

Live album by Generation X
- Released: 20 June 2005
- Recorded: 13 December 1980
- Venue: Hatfield Polytechnic, Hertfordshire
- Genre: New wave
- Length: 67:04
- Label: EMI

Generation X chronology
Live at Sheffield (2003)	Live (2005)

Live is a live album by English new wave band Gen X, released 20 June 2005 by EMI. It was recorded on 13 December 1980 at Hatfield Polytechnic, in Hertfordshire.

== Track listing ==
=== Live ===
All tracks are written by Billy Idol and Tony James; except where noted.

No.	Title	Writer(s)	Length
1.	"What Do You Want"		3:42
2.	"New Order"		2:56
3.	"Heavens Inside"		2:58
4.	"Untouchables"	Idol	3:36
5.	"Andy Warhol"	David Bowie	3:11
6.	"Stars Look Down"		4:34
7.	"Joy Mama"	Gene Vincent	1:09
8.	"Vicious"	Lou Reed	3:04
9.	"Rock On"	Gary Glitter, Mike Leander	2:16
10.	"Jet Boy"	David Johansen, Johnny Thunders	3:38
11.	"Poison"		2:55
12.	"Dancing with Myself"		4:18
13.	"Kiss Me Deadly"		4:33
14.	"Happy People"		4:46
15.	"Ready Steady Go"		3:24
16.	"King Rocker"		2:23
17.	"Triumph"		3:39
18.	"Gimme Some Truth"	John Lennon	3:30
19.	"Wild Youth"		2:45
20.	"Your Generation"		3:55

== Personnel ==
Generation X

- Billy Idol − vocals
- Tony James − bass
- James Stevenson − guitar
- Terry Chimes − drums
