= Tony James (musician) =

British musician

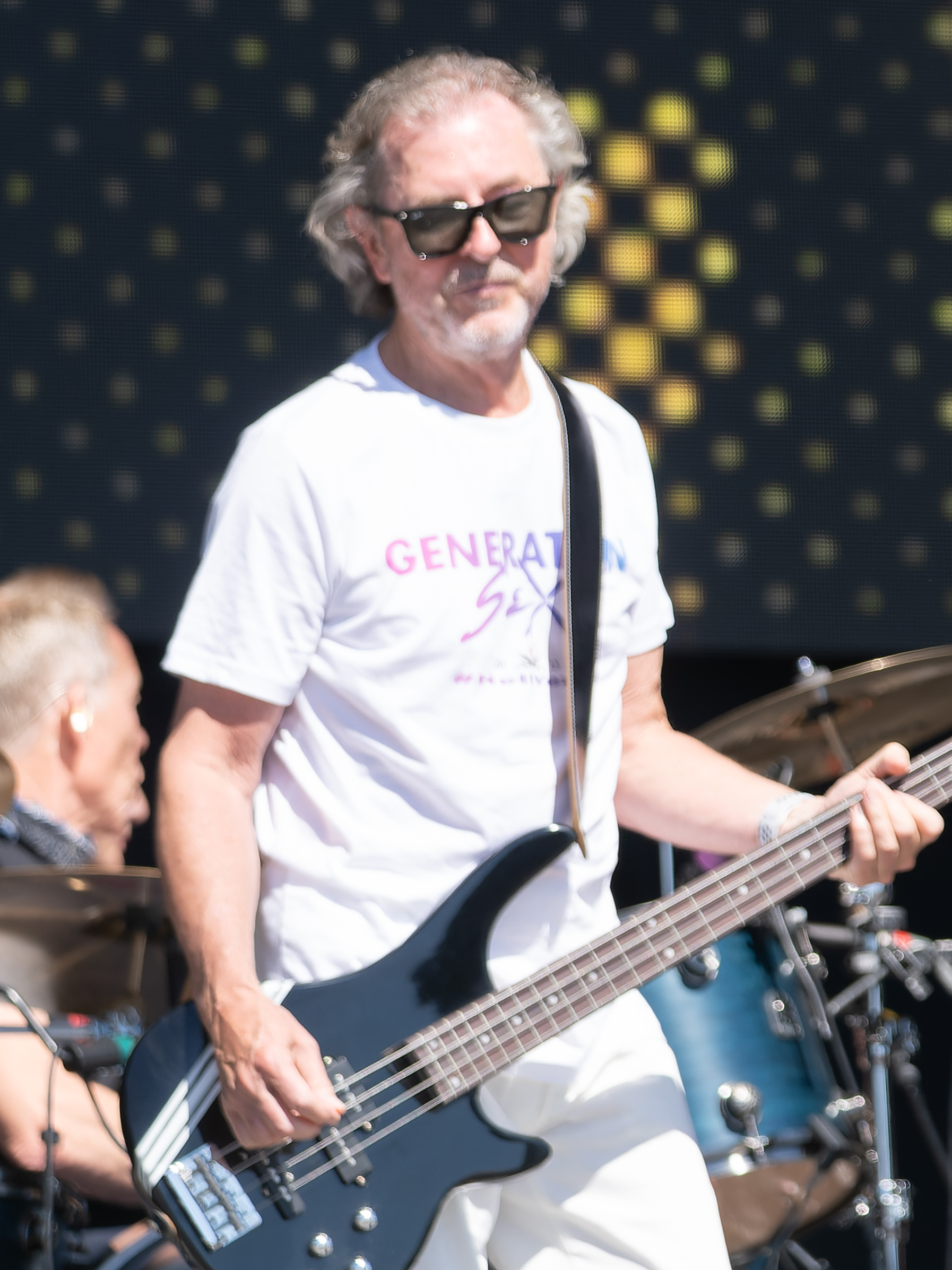
- James performing in 2023

Background information
- Born: Anthony Eric James; 12 April 1953 (age 73); Shepherd's Bush, London, England
- Genres: Punk rock; pop punk; post-punk; new wave
- Occupations: Musician; record producer
- Instruments: Bass guitar; guitar
- Years active: 1975–present
- Website: carbonsilicon.com sputnikworld.com

Anthony Eric James (born 12 April 1953) is an English musician who was the bassist for the 1970s–1980s bands Generation X, Sigue Sigue Sputnik and the Sisters of Mercy.

== Early life ==
Anthony Eric James was born in Shepherd's Bush in West London on 12 April 1953, and spent his childhood years in Twickenham. After formal education at Hampton Grammar School he attended Brunel University, from which he graduated with first-class honours in mathematics and computer science. Before becoming a professional musician he was briefly employed as a computer programmer in the accounting department of a company.

== Career ==
=== London S.S. ===
In 1975, James was a member of an early London proto-punk rock formation styling itself as The London S.S., along with Chris Miller (Rat Scabies) and Brian James (later of The Damned) and Mick Jones and Terry Chimes (both future members of The Clash).

=== Generation X ===
In late 1976, James joined the new band Chelsea as its bassist, the group included William Broad (a member of the Bromley Contingent) on guitar, John Towe on drums and Gene October as its frontman/lead singer. After a few weeks and a handful of support gigs in London and Manchester, James and Broad parted company with Gene October over a lack of personal chemistry, which October reciprocated the sentiment of, and departed taking John Towe with them to form another new band which they named Generation X. Broad renamed himself with the performance punk pseudonym "Billy Idol" as he switched from the guitarist's role to be the singer/frontman on the recruitment of Bob "Derwood" Andrews as its lead guitarist.

Generation X played their first gigs in London in December 1976, and swiftly began writing their own material and playing live in venues around London and further afield. After five months Towe was dropped from the group's formation at James's instigation, and was replaced by the drummer Mark Laff, to complete the line-up that signed to Chrysalis Records and released the band's first single, "Your Generation" in September 1977, which entered the Top 40 of the UK Singles Chart. The band went on to release two long-players, the self-titled Generation X (1978) and Valley of the Dolls (1979), and several singles, all but one of which charted, and through a hectic touring schedule increasingly gained media recognition as one of the acts with a potentially bright commercial future that had emerged from the punk rock scene.

However, in early 1979 the band's internal cohesion began to come apart after the relative commercial failure of the Valley of the Dolls L.P., which had gone no higher than #51 in the U.K. Albums Chart, and disagreements arose within it about its future musical direction in London's post-punk landscape, the writing process and credits for its work, augmented by the appearance of personality clashes. These came to a head in late 1979 during the recording of what was the band's (unfinished) third long-player (retrospectively commercially released 20 years later under the title Sweet Revenge). Generation X broke up in acrimony at the year's end with Andrews the lead guitarist quitting the act, and Idol and James asking its drummer Mark Laff to leave the band shortly afterwards over another disagreement.

=== Gen X ===
After abandoning the recording sessions at Olympic Studios, in early 1980 James and Idol re-launched the band in the New Romantic style, re-titled with the new name Gen X, with the drummer Terry Chimes. Re-recording some of the material from the abortive Olympic sessions, along with several new songs, at the beginning of 1981 it released a long-player entitled Kiss Me Deadly, featuring session-playing from several different lead guitarists in the absence of a permanent one in the band's line-up. A small tour was also carried out to promote the new band with James Stevenson having been brought in as its stand-in guitarist. Kiss Me Deadly was a commercial failure on release, failing to enter in the UK's Albums Chart, with its only single release "Dancing with Myself" also failing to enter the Top 40 Singles Chart; in consequence Chrysalis Records dropped the band's contract and the band broke up, with Idol leaving to pursue a solo career in the United States of America.

=== Sigue Sigue Sputnik ===
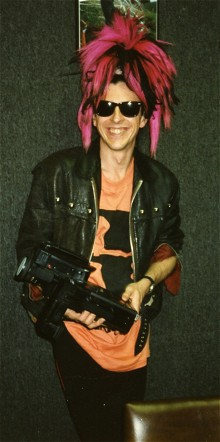
James in San Francisco, 1986

In 1981, after writing the single release "Russian Roulette" for the band The Lords of the New Church, playing on The London Cowboys' album Animal Pleasure and producing Sex Gang Children's album Song and Legend, James formed the new wave act Sigue Sigue Sputnik, with whom he wrote and performed until 1989.

=== Subsequent career ===
In 1990, James became the bassist with The Sisters of Mercy, performing on the album Vision Thing and on the band's subsequent live tour: however he left the band the following year. On 20 September 1993, during Billy Idol's No Religion Tour, James joined Generation X for a one-off reunion performance at the Astoria Theatre in London's West End.

From 2002 to 2013 James worked with Mick Jones, his erstwhile associate from the London S.S. in the mid-1970s, in an act titled Carbon/Silicon, with James co-writing songs and playing guitar.

James appeared at the 2023 Glastonbury Festival as a member of Generation Sex, featuring James and Billy Idol from Generation X, and Steve Jones and Paul Cook from the Sex Pistols.

== Discography ==
=== Generation X ===
- 1978 – Generation X (Chrysalis Records)
- 1979 – Valley of the Dolls (Chrysalis Records)
- 1998 – Sweet Revenge (Empty Records) (originally recorded in 1979)
- 2004 – K.M.D. – Sweet Revenge Xtra (Revel Yell Music) (featuring bonus tracks)

Generation X Compilations

- 1985 – The Best of Generation X (Chrysalis Records)
- 1990 – The Idol Generation (Castle Communications) (Australia only.)
- 1991 – Perfect Hits 1975–81 (Chrysalis Records)
- 1999 – Live at the Paris Theatre '78 & '81 (EMI Records) (edited and reissued in 2002 as One Hundred Punks – BBC Live in Concert)
- 2002 – Radio 1 Sessions (Strange Fruit Records)
- 2003 – Anthology (EMI Records)
- 2003 – Live at Sheffield (Empty Records)
- 2005 – Live (EMI Records)

=== Gen X ===
- 1981 - Kiss Me Deadly (Chrysalis Records).

=== London Cowboys ===
- 1982 – Animal Pleasure (Underdog Records)

=== The Lydons and the O'Donnells ===
- 1986 – Family Album (MBC Records)

=== Sigue Sigue Sputnik ===
- 1986 – Flaunt It (Parlophone Records)
- 1988 – Dress for Excess (Parlophone Records)
- 1996 – Sputnik: The Next Generation (EMI Records) (as "Sputnik: The Next Generation")
- 2000 – Sci-Fi Sex Stars (Sputnikworld Records) (as "Sci-Fi Sex Stars")
- 2001 – Piratespace (Sputnikworld Records)
- 2002 – Blak Elvis vs. The Kings of Electronic Rock and Roll (Sputnikworld Records)
- 2003 – Ultra Real (Sputnikworld Records)

Sigue Sigue Sputnik Compilations

- 1990 – The First Generation (Jungle Records)
- 1997 – The First Generation – Second Edition (Jungle Records)
- 1998 – The Ultimate 12" Collection (Sputnikworld Records)
- 1999 – Flaunt It + Dress for Excess – French single CD edition of both albums (minus "Success" and "Dancerama").
- 2001 – 21st Century Boys: The Best of Sigue Sigue Sputnik (EMI Records)
- 2003 – The First Generation – Vid Edition (Jungle Records)
- 2008 – 1984 Flaunt It: Demos and More (Cleopatra Records)

=== The Sisters of Mercy ===
- 1990 – Vision Thing (MBC Records)

=== Fin de Siécle ===
- 2003 – This Is What I Like...... (Sputnikworld Records)

=== Carbon/Silicon ===
- 2007 – The Magic Suitcase EP (Carbon/Silicon Records)
- 2007 – The Last Post (Carbon/Silicon Records)
- 2008 – Carbon Casino (Carbon/Silicon Records)

Carbon/Silicon digital releases

- 2010 – A.T.O.M. (Carbon/Silicon Records)
- 2010 – Western Front (Carbon/Silicon Records)
- 2010 – The Crackup Suite Parts 1 and 2 (Carbon/Silicon Records)
- 2010 – The Carbon Bubble (Carbon/Silicon Records)
- 2013 – Big Surprise (Carbon/Silicon Records)
