= Westworld (British band) =

UK musical group

- Genres: Pop rock; rockabilly
- Years active: 1986–1994
- Label: RCA
- Past members: Bob "Derwood" Andrews; Elizabeth Westwood; Gary "Gaz" Young; Tracey "T.J." O'Conner; Nick Burton

Westworld was a British pop rock/rockabilly band of the late 1980s, best known for its 1987 UK Top 20 hit single, "Sonic Boom Boy".

== History ==
Named after the sci-fi film Westworld, it was formed in 1986 by former Generation X guitarist Bob "Derwood" Andrews and American vocalist Elizabeth Westwood. The line up was completed by drummer Nick Burton. Before the recording and release of their third and final album, Burton left the band and was replaced by Gary "Gaz" Young and Tracey "T.J." O'Conner, making them a quartet.

Visually the band were styled in a way reminiscent of comic book art and musically they were a blend of classic 1950s rock and roll, glam and punk, updated with beatboxes and sequencer. They had an early success with their debut single "Sonic Boom Boy", which reached #11 in the UK Singles Chart in February 1987, and was used in Sony's advertisements. They had one more Top 40 hit, "Ba-Na-Na-Bam-Boo" which reached #37 in May the same year. They released three albums before moving to the Arizona desert in the US in 1992 to form the band Moondogg.

Although not successful in the US, their song "Painkiller" reached #17 on the San Francisco modern rock station Live-105's (KITS) "Top 105.3 Songs of 1988".

The JAMs' "Whitney Joins the JAMs", a house mash-up single, was built around samples of Whitney Houston, Isaac Hayes, Lalo Schifrin's Mission: Impossible theme tune, and (according to later sleevenotes), Westworld.

Westworld's track, "Ba-Na-Na-Bam-Boo", appeared on the soundtrack to the 1987 film, Planes, Trains & Automobiles; whilst another of their songs, "So Long Cowboy", was on the soundtrack to the 1991 movie Point Break.

A retrospective LP, entitled Sick Cool, containing material from the band recorded in the period 1992-1994 period was commercially released in 2018 in the United States.

== Discography ==
=== Studio albums ===
- Where the Action Is / Rockulator (1987)
- Beatbox Rock 'N' Roll (1988)
- Movers and Shakers (1991)
- Sick Cool (2018)

=== Compilation albums ===
- Beatbox Rock 'N' Roll (1997)

=== Singles ===
- "Sonic Boom Boy" (1987) UK #11, AUS #27
- "Ba-Na-Na-Bam-Boo" (1987) UK #37, AUS #79
- "Where the Action Is" (1987) UK #54
- "Silvermac" (1987) UK #42
- "Everything Good Is Bad" (1988) UK #72
- "Dance On" (1989)
- "Do No Wrong" (1991)
- "Lipsyncher" (1992)

=== Soundtrack appearances ===
Title	Release	Soundtrack
"Ba-Na-Na-Bam-Boo"	1987	Planes, Trains and Automobiles
"So Long Cowboy"	1991	Point Break

== See also ==
- Now That's What I Call Music 9 (UK series)
