= Martin Lee Stephenson =

- Also known as: Apollon, Doppler 20:20, Vulse
- Born: Martin Lee Stephenson
- Origin: London, England
- Instruments: bass guitar, cello, percussion, electronic instruments
- Labels: Sony, BMG, EMI, AVEX, D.O.R., Copasetic, Better, Reel 2 Reel, Law and Auder, Sub and Bleep, Slammin', Quirky, 3MV, Pro One, Squat, Keda, Offspring Records, dScript, vinyl fanatics.

Martin Lee Stephenson is a British experimental sound artist, musician, producer and songwriter from London. He is one half of the experimental act Spooncurve (with Faye Rochelle) and the composer/producer for the occult/hermetic inspired dark ambient project Apollon (apollon93). He also records under the names of Doppler 20:20 and Vulse. At the end of 2025, he had released more than 300 recordings. The primary labels of these releases were recording companies Sony, BMG, EMI, AVEX and independent labels D.O.R., Copasetic, Better, Reel 2 Reel, Law and Auder, Sub and Bleep, Slammin', Quirky, 3MV, Pro One, Squat, Keda and Offspring Records.

Remixes have included work for Pigface, Genesis P-Orridge, Patricia Kass, Kuljit Bhamra MBE and a wide range of experimental acts in the electronica genre.

His music has been included on films Winter of Love, Flash, A Quiet Desperation, Better Than Chocolate, SLC Punk, TV shows in the UK, Germany, France and the US and avant-garde experimental films both of his own and other directors creations. With visuals, he tends to work with the retro super-8 genre, but has also been known to produce short digital films. He is a member of the FONO art collective.

Stephenson is the grandson of music hall entertainer Leslie Harris and the great grandson of lyric writer and bohemian concert arranger Phillip Harris.

== Early career ==
After several minor rock bands and song writing partnerships, Lee-Stephenson started his career as a programmer and record producer within the UK acid house scene in the late 80's, evolving into techno and early jungle. There was a return to this evolved format with early drum and bass recordings that led to extensive work including over 40 record releases with London labels Law and Auder {law and order}, pro one {as Utomica} and sub and bleep records. The hardcore releases "rockabye" and "Pumpkin" by Utomica {rockabye with Lee-Stephenson's piano line} were released in 1993. During this time, Lee-Stephenson also had a short term recording contract through BMG records as singer/bass with Gothic act Randeshka Jane, which featured various musicians at different times: Irmgard Pilshofer, Nick Chown {The Bolshoi}, Chris Clarke {nosferatu}, Thunderstick {Iron Maiden, Samson}, Donna Bailey, JJ Marauder, Chris Kelly. Lee-Stephenson was also working through various studios from the start to the mid-1990s, and working alongside Larry Lush and Phillip Earle of Rising High Records, Bobbi Style {including live performance} and session bass playing. He remixed over 50 releases for other artists in a two-year period.

Stephenson occasionally released cassette releases through Buba recordings, and white label acid house, techno and early industrial 12inch pressings early in his career. In 1988, a white label pressing of Stephenson's "Hello Orgasm" with the b-side "Goodbye World" was played through the acid house sunrise circuit and at events: biology, 2000a.d. and shoom in the South of England, and on center force radio. Another buba pressing "Panther Hips/Poison Lips xxx" was released in 1989. In 1992 Stephenson began to re-master and occasionally remix the Trojan records reggae and ska catalogue.

Working from Dynamic Studios in Dalston, London, Notting Hill Studios, pro one studios in Walthamstow, London and Descript {UK}, M L Stephenson began a period of ambient/chill out works which occasionally continues to present. The Utomica singles were released on Pro One in 1992. In 1993 Blue Water School was formed with David Salvi and the album "physics" was released on December Dawn, in the UK, Germany, France and the USA. This was followed later that year by the dark ambient work Vulse and the album Inside. Vulse also contributed a track "Phobos" to the compilation "Earth" for D.O.R. (Infinity) in 1995.

In 1994, Martin Lee Stephenson began work as producer for Moondogg, with Westworld's Bob Andrews {from Generation X fame} and Elizabeth Westwood. They were joined as guest musician by Rat Scabies of the Damned. The first album "Fat Lot of Good" was released through Better in the UK and Avex in Japan. A single from the album "Wonderfool" was nominated "single of the week" in the UK publication Melody Maker, and the band received extensive press across Europe. Two other singles were taken from the album: "Silver Lining" and "Black Pain". The follow-up album God's Wallop was released on D.O.R.. During this time, Stephenson began work with Isolationist/experimental Label D.O.R., after previously having involvement with similar isolationist label Sentrax. This relationship has continued to present, with the majority of the Apollon releases being through D.O.R., both full albums and compilation tracks. December Dawn and D Script recordings were also formed at this time and in collaboration with D.O.R., released the first recordings by Doppler 20:20 album {árt Electrique}, an electronic, dub influenced experimental work, Sundew, Vulse and Lemon Ensemble. At this time, Lee Stephenson was working mainly from the Law and Auder studios in both Hoxton and the Oval, London, and Descript studios.

The early Law and Order {lauren auder} drum and bass 12" "Num Yo Ho" was released in 1993 by Pro One that looped a Buddhist mantra over a 170bpm breakbeat pattern, followed by "Who Run Tings?", a dark techno inspired drum and bass track which featured Stephenson, Elliot-Potter {of Friends Lovers and Family} and Pearl. Elliot-Potter {later Larry Lush} and Stephenson later collaborated on an early "trip hop" release on white label through Pro One under the name of "Martin and Lawrence". Law and Auder continued a high output of early techno, ambient, jungle and drum and bass recordings for labels: Rising High Records, Cantankerous, Slammin', Pro One, Sub and Bleep. The 1994 e.p. "Technology Works" was pressed for Pro One, along with another white label release "Futures Dance". In 1995 Law and Auder released the amen heavy "Gimme the Weed", followed with "Sunshine", and "Can't Tekkit" for sub and bleep records. "Can't Tekkit" also appeared alongside a Law and Order/G-Fource track "Jungle Move" on the "Jungle Combat" 1995 Sub and Bleep CD compilation. "Too Right", "Feel It" and "My Time" for G-Fource recordings and "It's Alright" "Street Knowledge" "Touch me", "exorcist" and "Bust the Nu Jam" for Slammin' Wrecx were released the same year. The Ragga/jungle "All Junglist" was also released on white label through G-Fource in 1995, featuring Leslie Lyrics {Dr William Lez Henry, Ph.D} on vocal. Stephenson also collaborated with DJ Hustler for Choice FM in 1995.

== Later career ==
Spooncurve were formed in 1996 and released their first trip hop inspired work through Copasetic records, Quirky, Cantankerous and later Better, releasing mainly one off 12-inch singles with minor hits in the UK and French dance scenes, with radio broadcasts including the BBC, Choice and Kiss FM.

Spooncurve recorded a mini album for Better in 1997. The act joined D.O.R in 2000, preferring the artistic freedom of the label and allowing time for the act to evolve. Spooncurve have released two full albums, "Are Friends Symmetric" in 2005 and "Clairsentience" in 2009, plus three singles with D.O.R. to date.

Spooncurve share a co-writing credit with Kate Bush on the single " Meaning of Lovers". A version of "meaning of lovers" appears on the "triphopricy" compilation on Squat recordings in 1997.

A single from Spooncurve's first album Hurt Me, I'm Yours and the video for the track has become popular among the BDSM scene on the internet. Faye Rochelle's voice has appeared on many of Stephenson's recordings, including "Seed" and "The Avantgardist" by doppler 20:20, "Lemon Ensemble" and "Sunshine" by Law and Order. Faye Rochelle also appeared alongside Lol Gellor on "Koan" a collaboration with Kuljit Bhamra MBE. The following artists have remixed Spooncurve's work: Muslimgauze, Pearl, Friends Lovers and Family, Tasha Killer Pussies, DJ Hustler, Future Forces, Doppler 20:20, Apollon, Hopa, Funkturm, Moondogg. Faye Rochelle and Stephenson appeared on "So?" by Oyster, a track released on Law and Order's "Avant-gardism" compilation, along with Spooncurve's "Pray for my soul" in 1997. Stephenson worked with Dave Milae on some remix work for the act Talk Talk in this year, along with Stephenson's remix work for Pigface.

In 1997 and 1998, Apollon collaborated on two full albums with Muslimgauze: Dark Thoughts and Year Zero and also compiled the Muslimgauze remix album "Abu Dis" for D.O.R. This collaboration may have influenced Stephenson's interest towards middle eastern percussion and style, which has been used on album's such as Koan's "Prana and Drum" {alongside drummer Lol Gellor of Desmond Decker/Speedometers fame} and later Apollon works.

A hip hop album with Bandulu members Sons of the Subway, Ruff Rugged and Real, features Stephenson's bass playing, and was recorded by Stephenson and David Salvi, released on Infonet in 1997.

In 1998 Stephenson produced, mixed and played bass on the Transatlantic Freejazz Collective's "Lemon Ensemble". It also featured musicians Jerry Judd, Derwood Andrews, Faye Rochelle, Eric Mingus, Lol Gellor, Swampdog, Jon Martin {Pizzaman}, Darius and Lawrence Steel. He also worked within the folk music, neo-folk and World music genres with notable musicians Kuljit Bhamra, Faye Rochelle, Stefan Hannigan, Michael Garrick, Ben Clark {sine}, Ray Hearn, Henry Thomas, Nick Beggs, Chi2, Eduardo, Gary Crosby, Saskia Tomkins and Nigel Eaton.

Stephenson provided technical assistance on the 1999 release by Chemical Plant, The Cold Store Tapes. Doppler 20:20 collaborated with Pearl on both "The Searchers" for the No Bones "artifacts" compilation in 1998 and "Suck My Phat One" for Law and Orders's "Minimalism: More or Less" in 1999. Doppler 20:20's experimental electronica second album "Klangfarbenmelodie" was released on D.O.R. in 1998, along with the 12" "Where's the Funk?" featuring Jon Martin on vocals.

Late in the 1990s, work began with Muslimgauze, Kuljit Bhamra, Nigel Eaton, Peter Gabriel Real World artists and Steafan Hannigan from the folk/World Folk/world genre, increasing his own percussion playing.

His collaboration with Kuljit Bhamra led to other work between the two producers, including tracks and bass playing for Bhangra star Sangeeta on the Time to Dance album released on Keda in 1998, Bhamra's solo album Burning at Melting Point featuring Julian Clary, Balbir Bittul, Mike Lindup, Russell Churney and John Mccoy, the film Winter of Love and the compilation Birth of Southall Bhangra released in 2010. Live performances in and around London followed these collaborations, and also a doppler 20:20 performance in 1998 at the Institute of Contemporary Arts, London, England. featuring Muslimgauze as a guest performer.

In 2000 the Koan album Prana and Drum featuring Stephenson, Bhamra, Gellor, Faye Rochelle, Anita Masih and Persian Music exponent Christoph Bracher was released on D.O.R.. A Koan Track "Don't Kill the Wail" was released on Law and Order's "East-Westercism" compilation, and "Sati" was released for D.O.R.

Stephenson appears in 2001 as "Martin Lee-Stephenson" on the classically inspired "Prelude au Sommeil" and "Melodies Douceurs" released by Belgium label Music avenue. Three tracks are by Stephenson on the compilations: "Waltz for the Last Man", "Figment in D" and "Clouds and Falls".

The Apollon album Nox was released on Vuzh in 2002.

Stephenson co-wrote and arranged "Country and Eastern", a Faye Rochelle mini album released on descript in 2000. The sound art compilation "Drift" was mastered for D.O.R. in 2003. In 2003, Stephenson co-wrote and produced Faye Rochelle's "Reflections" solo album, released on Offspring Records in 2004.

A further collaboration with Bob Derwood Andrews resulted in the "American Commentary" album under the name of Bowleg/MLS, and released on Rubbercheese records in 2006.

Doppler 20:20's "Musica Liquida" was released in 2007 through DOR infinity.

== 2008-present ==
Stephenson began a period of circuit bending using old electronic equipment and children's toys, and incorporating them into both Apollon93 and Doppler 20:20 recordings. A "stretch work" series of recordings also began.

In 2008, an album with US act "Temple of Inner Light" was recorded for Advaita Audio using split stereo channeling and evp recordings. Crowned and Conquering Child was also released on D.O.R.

In 2009, Metabelief was released on net label EMP. "The Whore" by Apollon was released via DOR/Infinity, and in 2010 "...and the Beast She Rides Upon" was also released by DOR, to complete a trilogy along with the earlier "Crowned".

Made in India a compilation on Keda was released in 2011 and features M L Stephenson's bass on the track and short film Not Pyramid Selling.

Doppler 20:20's fourth album Sonido Quebrado was released on DOR infinity in 2012.

At the start of 2012, Stephenson and Faye Rochelle began two more projects, a neo-folk "unplugged" album for Faye Rochelle and another Spooncurve album. He also continues the Doppler 20:20 act and the extensive output of the Apollon works. Apollon often utilises retro tape looping techniques, field recordings, middle eastern percussion and mantra, shifting through harsh noise experiments to dark ambient soundscapes and drones. In 2012, "Emerald Tablet" was released on DOR. At the end of 2012, Apollon has released ten albums to date.

In 2012, Apollon collaborated on an album with Palestinian musician Dirar Kalash. In December 2012 the sound art work "clockwork mouse" and ambient works "Blue Star", "essense of time" and "Spiral and Rose" were recorded for the musique concrete net label IFAR, under Stephenson's own name. An Apollon collaboration with Shaun Robert "Still burning well" under the name of "Apollon Db pit 93" was also released by the label. Stephenson has recently announced a series of Apollon "dissonance works" with an album collaboration between 9Apollon3/Secret Chiefs "Archons for Lilith" and the Apollon album "Kybalion" for D.O.R./infinity, heavily featuring dissonant hermetic inspired drone works and "stream of consciousness" sound collages.

In 2013, Stephenson announced that another Doppler 20:20 album Fragments for a Broken Culture is completed and will be released through DOR/Infinity. An album by Bobbi Style 'Eighties' featuring Stephenson on Bass guitar, was released late 2013. In 2014, more "Scarlet Temple" recordings were made for Spooncurve, and another album for 9Apollon3/Secret chiefs was recorded. The doppler 20:20 recording "PR99" was released in the summer of 2014 on the IFAR "Musique Concrète tape manipulations" compilation. In 2015, a biography was published, IBRAHIM KHIDER – Muslimgauze: Chasing The Shadow Of Bryn Jones – book + CD features an interview with Stephenson.In 2018, Stephenson had begun further work with THee Secret Chiefs/Apollon93. 'Modulation is Key', a Doppler 20:20 album was released on DOR for 2020, along with Apollon93 albums "Ninth ArchGnosticTestamentScriptureThe Hermit' and 'Outside The circles of Time'. A digital Album by Apollon23 'Electric Swarm in Hell' was released in 2020 by Basementcorner/Bandcamp, and two other Apollon93/23 digital albums 'The Amon' and 'Through The Veil' were released by Gates of Hypnos/Bandcamp. In 2021, Stephenson partnered with Chris Abbot of the early techno label Infonet to form 'Infonet Electronic' an art based NFT music label focusing on early 1990s Experimental dance music.Stephenson re-mixed the Moondogg Generation x cover 'love like fire' in 2023. In 2026, Stephenson relaunched the dSCRIPT label, featuring acts Electronic Waste, So What next, The Attained.

== Recording techniques ==
Stephenson uses a mixture of retro tape manipulation, tape mastering, looping, old synthesizers and pedals with digital mastering and editing. On most occasions he uses Logic Pro and Pro Tools for the final editing, or even within the initial compositions. As his first instrument is Bass Guitar {following initial 'cello training} he often uses his vintage fretless Rickenbacker 4001 within his recordings, but often manipulates the sound to such a degree that it is used as a texture within the recordings. He has also used circuit bending using children's toys and old sound equipment, found sound and field recording. With Stephenson's more acoustic work he sometimes uses middle eastern percussion and European stringed folk instruments. As his approach is experimental, he does not confine himself to one technique and has used high end studios, live recordings and more minimalist, self-contained home studios. Recording process is as eclectic as the various genres Stephenson uses, and locations outside of studios have included churches, factories, offices, asylums, hospitals, clubs, sports arena, EVP recordings inside "haunted" locations, electrical pylons, concerts, markets, public transport alongside outside field recordings.

Instruments Stephenson has played on recordings includes Bass guitar, guitar, cello, drums, dumbek, dulcimer, tumbak, bongos, tambura, recorder, tar, congas, dholak, djembe, bodhran, tumbi, ukulele, sitar, synthesiser, piano, chapman stick, harmonium, violin.
