= Spooncurve =

Spooncurve is an experimental alternative music act from the United Kingdom composed of Faye Rochelle{vocalist} and Martin Lee Stephenson, which has evolved over time from an early trip hop act to become associated with "shoegaze" ambient and/or gothic music.

Faye Rochelle has been involved with albums featuring Kuljit Bhamra, Steafan Hannigan {Peter Gabriel, Afro Celt Sound System] Nigel Eaton {Page and Plant} Ray Hearn and other notable musicians across the World music and experimental.electronica music genres.

Martin Lee Stephenson has produced and played on various recordings including Moondogg {Westworld, Generation X, The Damned members}, Kuljit Bhamra, Patricia Kass, Koan, Eric Mingus, Pigface, Muslimgauze, Doppler 20:20, Law and Auder. and various others, again across the experimental/World music genres.

The act have appeared on Copasetic Records, Quirky, DScript, Better records and DOR, also various tracks with 3MV, Squat and Law and Order. Spooncurve recorded a mini album for better records in 1997.

The following artists have remixed Spooncurve's work: Muslimgauze, Pearl, Friends Lovers and Family, Tasha Killer Pussies, DJ Hustler, Future Forces, Doppler 20:20, Apollon, Hopa, Funkturm, Moondogg. Faye Rochelle and Stephenson appeared on "So?" by Oyster, a track released on Law and Order's "Avant-gardism" compilation, along with Spooncurve's "Pray for my soul" in 1997.

== Discography ==
Spooncurve have released six singles, one mini album, and two full albums to date.

The album "are friends symmetric" was released on D.O.R. in 2006. The album "clairsentience" was released in 2009.

A recent single WHEN DAYLIGHT COMES was released on D.O.R./iTunes

HURT ME, I'M YOURS was released via D.O.R.

The act also appear on various compilations, such as Triphoprisy 4 {squat}, ABU DIS {DOR/LAW AND ORDER}, Avantgardism 2 {LAW AND ORDER}, The Knowledge {3MV}, The Wire Tapper 15 {THE WIRE} etc.

A series of live recordings were recorded in 2012 from the "Scarlet Temple" private function performances and will be released at a later date. In 2013 Spooncurve announced that a new album is near completion.
