= Sweet Revenge (Generation X album) =

Studio album by Generation X
- Released: 14 April 1998
- Recorded: 1979
- Genres: Punk rock; pop punk
- Length: 56:05 (Japan)
- Labels: Empty Records (MT-421); Revell Yell Music (RYCD019)

Generation X chronology
| Perfect Hits 1975–81 (1991) | Sweet Revenge (1998) | Live at the Paris Theatre '78 & '81 (1999) |

Sweet Revenge is the fourth and final studio album by English punk rock band Generation X, though it was chronologically their third recorded album.

Generation X broke up during the original 1979 studio sessions that the record comprises, which were little more than demo sessions made without a producer. The material first received commercial release in contested circumstances retrospectively in 1998.

== Production ==
Most of the songs on the record were composed and initially rehearsed in a house in the English county of Oxfordshire in the first half of 1979, rented by the band for the purpose of working together secluded from distractions to assemble what was intended to be its third LP. During this period Generation X was looking for a new sound after the commercial failure of its second LP Valley of the Dolls at the start of the year, and the new material was written with the intention of getting back to elemental song-writing, with more space musically in song construction. Billy Idol, the band's frontman/singer, did not enjoy the experience of working in the pastoral surroundings of the Oxfordshire countryside, and was unhappy with the quality of much of the material that it produced.

The record was demo recorded at the Olympic Studios in Barnes in early 1979 with the studio's in-house engineer Doug Bennett, with Idol and Tony James acting as producers. Further recording work was done at the same studio in July/August 1979, the latter sessions seeing the writing at the studio of the song "Dancing with Myself", which was regarded as an important event by Idol and James, the band's songwriters, as the song revealed a dynamic new dance-punk sound that they had been searching for since the failure of the band's second LP (a sound which would subsequently provide the foundation of Idol's solo career in the 1980s).

The LP was never finished due to Generation X breaking up in acrimony at the end of 1979 whilst it was still a work in progress. Idol and James went on in 1980 to relaunch the act under the new name of Gen X, salvaging several songs from the aborted recording sessions at Olympic Studios, and incorporating them into a new long-player release entitled Kiss Me Deadly (1981).

== Release & formats ==
The original 1979 recordings were first released retrospectively as an LP via the labels 'Empty Records' and 'Munster Records' in Europe in 1998. It was released via legal contractual obligation without the consent of Billy Idol or Tony James - the material's composers, and in the face of opposition from Idol, who believed the material it contained was unfit for the commercial market. The studio recording tapes that composed the first release came from Derwood Andrews, Generation X's former guitarist, who had parted company with Idol and James on bad terms at the time of the original recording sessions. Knowing there was opposition to the release of the material from Idol and James, Andrews named the album K.M.D. - Sweet Revenge (1998) referencing the subsequent LP Kiss Me Deadly which Idol & James had gone on to produce after he had left the band with a re-branded act and new personnel. An attempt to release K.M.D. - Sweet Revenge in the United States was successfully legally blocked. An American release of the same material from another audio source was issued four years later with Idol and James' consent as a part of the 2002 Generation X retrospective Anthology.

An expanded reissue LP entitled K.M.D. – Sweet Revenge Xtra (2004) was released in Japan, as a part of the "Derwood Andrews' tapes", without Idol & James' approval, featuring alternate mixes, this record also contains different studio variations of the songs "Rock On" and "Your Generation", together with two live songs recorded at a gig in December 1978.

== Track listing ==
=== K.M.D. - Sweet Revenge (1998 Empty Records (MT-421)) ===
All tracks are written by Billy Idol and Tony James.

| No. | Title | Length |
|---|---|---|
| 1. | "Dancing with Myself" | 4:56 |
| 2. | "Modern Boys" | 3:23 |
| 3. | "Stars Look Down" | 4:33 |
| 4. | "Triumph" | 5:09 |
| 5. | "Girls Girls Girls" | 3:03 |
| 6. | "Anna Smiles" | 2:28 |
| 7. | "Flash as Hell" | 2:28 |
| 8. | "Psycho Beat" | 3:35 |
| 9. | "Cathy Come Home" | 3:49 |
| 10. | "Revenge" | 5:38 |
| 11. | "Dancing with My Wealth" | 5:38 |

=== K.M.D. - Sweet Revenge Xtra (2004 Revel Yell Music (RYCD019)) ===
All tracks are written by Billy Idol and Tony James except where noted.

| No. | Title | Writer(s) | Length |
|---|---|---|---|
| 1. | "Dancing with Myself" | | 3:25 |
| 2. | "Modern Boys" | | 3:25 |
| 3. | "Stars Look Down" | | 4:43 |
| 4. | "Triumph" | | 5:15 |
| 5. | "Girls Girls Girls" | | 3:04 |
| 6. | "Anna Smiles" | | 2:28 |
| 7. | "Flash as Hell" | | 2:33 |
| 8. | "Psycho Beat" | | 3:36 |
| 9. | "Cathy Come Home" | | 3:51 |
| 10. | "Revenge" | | 5:17 |
| 11. | "Rock On*" | Gary Glitter, Mike Leander | 2:35 |
| 12. | "Your Generation*" | | 3:15 |
| 13. | "Shakin' All Over" (Live**) | Johnny Kidd, Gus Robinson | 2:40 |
| 14. | "Kiss Me Deadly" (Live**) | | 4:45 |
| 15. | "Dancing with My Wealth" | | 5:38 |

Notes

- (*) Recorded at T.W.Sounds, Fulham and mixed by Alan Winstanley. These two tracks were out-takes from the band's first album.
- (**) Recorded live in Sheffield, England on 8 December 1978. These two tracks are lifted from Live at Sheffield.

== Personnel ==
Generation X

- Billy Idol – vocals
- Tony James – bass
- Bob "Derwood" Andrews – guitar
- Mark Laff – drums
