= Release (agency) =

UK agency

- Formation: 1967
- Founders: Caroline Coon and Rufus Harris
- Purpose: Legal advice and legal representation for people charged with the possession of drugs
- Region served: UK
- Website: www.release.org.uk

Release, founded in 1967 by Caroline Coon and Rufus Harris (died 2007), is a UK charity that provides legal advice and arranges legal representation for people charged with the possession of drugs. Release is now the oldest independent drugs charity in the world and continues to provide a range of services dedicated to meeting the health, welfare and legal needs of drugs users and those who live and work with them.

== History ==
Founded in 1967, the aim of Release was to provide bail services to people arrested for drugs offences and to refer them to solicitors. A 24-hour telephone help line was set up and run by volunteers. Coon was the fundraiser and spokesperson for the organisation and Harris was the administrator. By the end of 1967 Release was based in an office at 50 Princedale Road, Holland Park. In its first two years, Release handled more than 2,000 cases. High-profile clients included John Lennon and George Harrison, who donated £5,000 in 1969.

In 1969 Harris and Coon summarised their early work in The Release Report on Drug Offenders and the Law, published by Sphere Books.

Release gained charitable status in 1972, following a review of its activities by the Rowntree Foundation. By the mid-1970s, Release was supported directly by a Home Office grant, without compromising its libertarian principles.

The agency ran a London bus advertising campaign entitled "Nice People Take Drugs" in 2009, but it was pulled a few days later, amidst claims of censorship by the advertising regulators.

Release remains the UK's only dedicated free legal and drugs advice service, offering a helpline for drug users and their families. Staffed by lawyers and drugs experts, the organisation supports people who use drugs and those who have been impacted by drug law enforcement. Release delivers legal community services, addressing homelessness, housing, welfare benefits and financial problems faced by the clients they work with and for, in a range of outreach settings, including homeless centres, drug treatment projects and sex work projects. The drugs team provide advocacy support for people in drug treatment settings. The organisation has produced research highlighting the disproportionate impact of drugs policing and laws have had on Black and ethnic minority communities in England and Wales. Release advocates for evidence based drug policies centred on principles of racial and social justice, including ending criminal sanctions for drug possession offences and models of regulation that repairs the harms created by prohibition.

Release has a long history of association with the heart of London and has been based in various premises around Old Street since the 1980s, moving to the Aldgate area in 2018.
