= Caroline Coon =

English artist (born 1945)

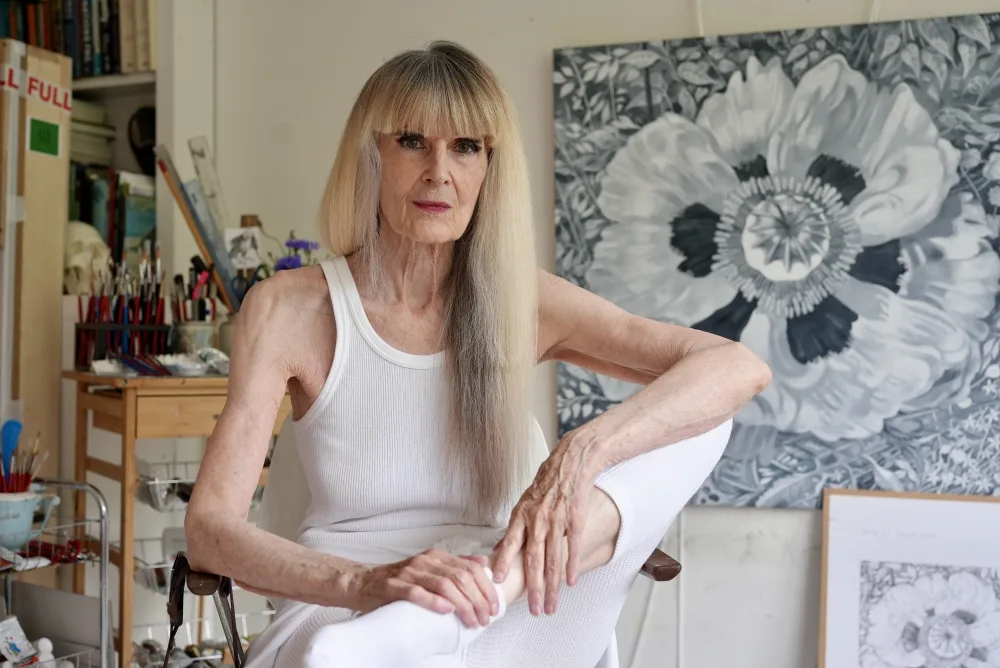
- Coon in her London studio, 2022
- Born: Caroline Mary Thompson Coon; 23 March 1945 (age 81); London, England
- Education: Legat Ballet School, Royal Ballet School, Northampton School of Art, Central School of Art, Brunel University
- Movement: Feminism, figurative art, pop art
- Website: www.carolinecoon.com

Caroline Mary Thompson Coon (born 23 March 1945) is an English artist known for her paintings, feminist political activism, writing, and photography. After coming to prominence first as a leader of the British Underground counterculture of the 1960s, and then in the vanguard of the punk rock movement of the 1970s, she is recognised today as a foremost figurative painter in contemporary British art, with her work included in landmark survey exhibitions at London's Hayward Gallery and Tate Britain.

While at Central School of Art in 1967, Coon co-founded the charity Release, which provided legal services for those arrested on drug possession charges. In the 1970s, earning money as a freelance journalist, including writing for Melody Maker, she became conscious of the zeitgeist change in youth culture which she christened the punk rock movement. Her photographs of the early punk days are now published and exhibited throughout the world. Coon managed The Clash from 1978 to 1980, through two significant tours in the UK and North America.

Since the early 1980s, Coon's primary focus has been her oil paintings which regularly feature women and men, both clothed and nude, in scenes that often contest the misogyny of patriarchy. With reference points as varied as Pauline Boty, Lorenzo Lotto, Artemisia Gentileschi and Henri Rousseau, her work has been compared to that of Paul Cadmus, Tamara de Lempicka, Gluck and Christian Schad. Since 2022, she has been represented by Stephen Friedman Gallery.

== Early life ==
Caroline Coon was born in London and raised on her parents' farm outside Maidstone, Kent. The eldest child and only girl in her family, she grew up surrounded by the paintings of her great-uncle, the artist Frank Moss Bennett, which contributed to her interest in art. From the age of five, she was sent as a boarder to the Legat Ballet School and trained by Russian teachers in a method which included yoga. At age ten she went to Sadler's Wells Ballet School, which later became the Royal Ballet School. As Coon told writer Christiana Spens in 2021; "…from an early age, I had this contrast between the patriarchal family home with the lies, and this other arena, where women worked as artists, and got paid for it. So intellectually, I had these contrasting worlds with which to feed into what I was going to become as an adult." Her parents moved the family to Northamptonshire in 1960.

After leaving the Royal Ballet School in London in 1961, the 16 year-old Coon took on a variety of jobs to earn a living as she continued her education to secure a place on a pre-diploma fine art course. She worked as a house model at various fashion brands including Alexon, Strelitz, and Norman Hartnell. An incident with the police – she forged her father's signature on a passport application form – necessitated Coon's return to Northamptonshire where she lived with her grandmother, attending a secretarial course by day and completing her A-level Art by night. She was accepted into the fine art pre-diploma at the Northampton School of Art in 1964.

== Studying in London ==
In 1965, she enrolled at Central College of Art in London. Coon's interest was primarily in figurative art at a time when abstract expressionism and the teachings of Clement Greenberg were favoured by the art world establishment. As she became increasingly politically active, she realised that figurative painting was the main means through which her art could express social commentary. To fund her studies, she worked as a glamour model for photographers like George Harrison Marks. In 1967, as Miss Mayfair in Mayfair Magazine, she appeared nude on the cover and as the centrefold, painted gold like actress Shirley Eaton in the Bond movie Goldfinger (1964).

At Central College of Art, one of Coon's tutors was the now renowned pop artist Derek Boshier. He introduced her to his friend and colleague, the seminal British pop artist Pauline Boty and her husband, the literary agent Clive Goodwin. Boty had appeared alongside Boshier in Ken Russell's 1962 television film Pop Goes The Easel for the BBC's Monitor series. Boty's art was to exert a powerful influence over Coon. After the young painter's untimely death from cancer in 1966, her widower Goodwin gave Boty's paints and brushes to Coon. Speaking to art historian Maria Elena Buszek in 2019, Coon said""he believed in me, I think. Whenever things got really tough, I could rely on the promise I made to myself after Boty died, to carry on where she left off. In a way, I've pulled through many a psychological and financial crisis and kept on painting in her honour."

Like Boty, as a fine art student Coon also did paid work in film and television. She appeared as an extra in both Blow Up (1966) and in the Vincent Price thriller The House of 1,000 Dolls (1967). She starred in Harrison Marks' erotic films Amour (1966) and The Naked World of Harrison Marks (1967). Alongside Boshier and Goodwin, she was cast as the Pre-Raphaelite model Annie Miller in Ken Russell's Dante's Inferno (1967), with Oliver Reed as Dante Gabriel Rossetti.

Coon's studies at the Central College ended in 1967 as she set-up Release. In the early 1970s, on the recommendation of British sociologist and criminologist Baroness Wooton of Abinger, whom she met through her work with Release, Coon returned to education at Brunel University, studying psychology, sociology, and economics.

== Release ==
In 1965, after seeing a friend, a young man from Jamaica, sentenced at the Old Bailey to three years in prison for possession of a negligible amount of cannabis, Coon came to believe that drug prohibition is significantly racist and prejudicial against the working class. From then on, she became actively involved in campaigns to decriminalise drug use in favour of a harm-reduction model of control. In June 1967, with Clive Godwin and Tariq Ali, she helped organise a demonstration outside the offices of the News of the World tabloid newspaper to protest against the demonisation of Mick Jagger and Keith Richards in coverage including the infamous Redlands police raid and arrest. There Coon met fellow art student Rufus Harris. They began discussions that led to the creation of Release, a legal advice service to help young people understand their rights, with a 24 hour helpline for anyone who was arrested in possession of drugs.

The office was initially run from the studio of Coon's West London basement flat. From there they moved to 50 Princedale Road in Holland Park, which was described by The New York Times as "a long, narrow room that was crowded with psychedelic posters, filing cabinets, desks, telephones and young people." In a landmark profile in Life magazine at the time, the journalist Horace Judson observed that:

"[i]n two years Release has become one of the most important civil liberties and legal-aid organisations in Britain. Besides the many cases where the police make an arrest but then do not press charges, Release takes from 50 to 80 cases a month into the courts. Six solicitors in London have handled the bulk of the more than 2,000 court cases over the last 18 months… no first offenders on cannabis charges helped by Release have been sent to prison whereas 17% of the total population of first cannabis offenders do get sent down."

Release and Coon were profiled regularly in the media in these years, including a short film on BBC's New Horizons series in May 1971. As well as thousands of young people, the service was used by those in the public eye, including John Lennon and George Harrison, who donated £5,000 to Release in 1969, and Mick Jagger whose film Performance (1970) was premiered as a benefit fundraiser for Release at his request.

In 1967, while protesting on the King's Road against the jail sentence of Brian Jones, Coon was arrested for damaging a police van in which several demonstrators, including Chris Jagger, were being held. After being sentenced to two weeks in Holloway Prison for refusing to pay the fine, she was freed by broadcaster Bernard Braden, who immediately recorded an interview for a documentary he was making on the Swinging Sixties. The footage was un-broadcast at the time, but in 2008 it featured in Channel 5's exploration of the Braden archives.

Release became widely known for its "Know Your Rights" bust cards that included the Release 24 hour telephone number. Initially designed by Coon, the bust card has been updated ever since to reflect changing laws. In 2014, an example of an early Release bust card was included at the V&A's Disobedient Objects exhibition. Coon twice appeared at parliamentary advisory committees to provide evidence on drug dependence and police corruption, insights which fed into the Wootton Report of 1969, and the Deedes Report (Powers of Arrest and Search in Relation to Drug Offences) of 1970.

In collaboration with co-founder Rufus Harris, Coon published The Release Report in 1969, a survey on their work to date, with a particular focus on how their efforts were often hampered by police corruption. Despite an initial attempt by the authorities to suppress the book, Coon and Harris succeeded in ensuring its widespread distribution. In 1971, alongside comedian Marty Feldman, philosophers Edward de Bono and Ronald Dworkin, and musician and broadcaster George Melly, Coon was called as a witness for the defence in the controversial obscenity trial brought against Oz Magazine.

== Journalism and punk rock ==
In order to support herself and the general activities of Release in the early 1970s, Coon took on numerous journalism commissions, often about drugs and youth culture, including pieces for Oz Magazine, Cosmopolitan, the Radio Times, the Ritz Newspaper (published by David Bailey and David Litchfield) and the Times Educational Supplement. This led to Ray Coleman, editor-in-chief of influential music magazine Melody Maker, asking her to write regular pieces, which she used as an opportunity to contest sexism in the music industry and foreground women's contribution to rock and pop music.

Over the following years, she published landmark profiles of Patti Smith, Olivia Newton-John, Joan Armatrading and Lynsey de Paul, as well as significant early interviews with Freddie Mercury, Elton John, Lou Reed, and Kraftwerk. One of her commissions was an extended interview with Yoko Ono for Cosmopolitan magazine, which the title declined after it was submitted, citing frustration at the lack of questioning about Ono's relationship with her children.

In 1976, Coon attended the Sex Pistols' second gig, on the recommendation of the film critic Alan Jones, who was then working at Vivienne Westwood's SEX shop on the King's Road. She was immediately struck by the iconoclastic fervour of the young band. In an interview with journalist Cazz Blase in 2010, Coon observed "if peace and love hadn't worked for young people, the next generation was going to become angry and express itself in opposition to what had gone before, which is how cultures work, that's the dialectic. That was my theory! And here was my theory of what counterculture was going to do next writ large."

Coon became a key player in the nascent punk scene, documenting in writing and photography its rise of key figures including the Sex Pistols, the Clash and The Slits. Following the publication of an August 1976 Melody Maker article, "Punk Rock: Rebels Against The System" she was credited by John Lydon (aka Johnny Rotten), with being the first to use the adjective 'punk' – The Punk Rock Movement - to describe the new era of rock music being made in UK. She also identified the first group of style-defining punk fans from Bromley including Siouxsie Sioux, Steve Severin, Billy Idol, Soo Catwoman and Jordan, as the 'Bromley Contingent'. When a charge of obscenity was brought against the Sex Pistols in November 1977, following the promotion of their album Never Mind the Bollocks… in Nottingham's Virgin Records' shop, Coon once again acted as a witness for the defence.

Cover for White Riot by The Clash (photo taken by Caroline Coon)

Coon became particularly associated with the band The Clash, taking the photo that was used as the cover of their first single "White Riot" in 1977. When the band parted ways with their first manager Bernie Rhodes, to prevent them breaking up like the Sex Pistols and The Damned, she stepped in to manage them through their 'Sort It Out' tour in Britain, and 'Give 'Em Enough Rope,' their first American dates, a move that held the band together, as they recorded and then released their highly acclaimed third album London Calling (1979).

Towards the end of the decade, having read her book '1988: The New Wave Punk Rock Explosion', American screenwriter Nancy Dowd enlisted Coon as creative consultant and costume designer for the film that was eventually released as Ladies and Gentlemen, The Fabulous Stains (1982). Coon helped Dowd develop the principal storyline centred about London's punk rock scene, and helped cast The Clash's Paul Simonon as bassist, the Sex Pistols' Paul Cook as the drummer and Steve Jones as lead guitarist, with Ray Winstone playing the role of lead singer in the onscreen band The Looters. When filming eventually took place in Canada in the winter of 1980, tensions between director Lou Adler and Dowd resulted in the screenwriter leaving the production in frustration at Adler's decisions. The film was released to cable, ignored until it was discovered by a new generation of musicians, including Kurt Cobain as well as the wider Riot Grrrl movement, who recognised it as a feminist clarion-call and turned into an underground cult movie hit.

== Art career ==
During her studies at the Central School of Art in the 1960s, Coon developed what become her distinctive painting style, using scenes and iconography to present a political narrative, with references to the Pop Art that contemporary figures like Boty pioneered, as well as the figurative stylings of interwar artists like Tamara de Lempicka and Gluck.

Two of her earliest paintings, "Marathon" (1966) and "My Beautiful Cunt" (1966) were sold in 1966 to the British theatre impresario Michael White and Boty's widower Clive Goodwin respectively. In 1971, she exhibited the now lost painting "Cuntucopia" (1967) as part of a fund-raiser for the Oz obscenity trial. Another early fan was the actor Julie Christie, who acquired 'Between Two Worlds' (1981) from Coon in the 1980s.

At a time when abstraction and conceptual art were most highly prized, Coon's figurative work struggled for recognition. In 1970, Germaine Greer included Coon in the dedications for her influential work The Female Eunuch with a tribute that nevertheless surprisingly voiced the prevailing prejudices of the day: "to CAROLINE, who danced, but badly, painted but badly…."

As commitments to Release, her music journalism and the wider punk movement consumed her time, Coon found it difficult to dedicate enough of her energy to painting. But, in the early 1980s, following the well-paid Hollywood consultancy on Ladies and Gentlemen, the Fabulous Stains, Coon was able to stop taking freelance jobs and concentrate on her art.

Although she lived frugally in her Ladbroke Grove studio, her debts mounted up as London galleries were still unable to see value in her work. By 1983, faced with the threat of the bank repossessing her studio home, she began working at a 'topless' bar in London's Soho and then some months in an escort agency, where she earned enough money to pay off her overdraft. This period is documented in her art book Laid Bare Diary: 1983-1984 (2016) and has informed many of the scenes depicted in her on-going sequence of paintings The Brothel Series.

In 1995, Coon was invited to include her painting 'Mr Olympia' (1983) in an educational pack to be produced alongside an exhibition of the work of Henri Matisse and other male artists in Tate Liverpool. The artwork was originally selected as an example of a nude painting by a female artist, but when the curators saw the full-sized image, and the semi-erect penis, they declined to include it, an act of censorship which earned Coon the moniker "the woman who paints penises."

In 2018, on the recommendation of her friend the artist Duggie Fields, curators Martin Green and James Lawler organised the first solo exhibition of Coon's work at The Gallery, Liverpool, 'Caroline Coon: The Great Offender' which surveyed paintings from her various series, including her flower paintings. A variation on this show was exhibited in 2019 at London's Tramps gallery, curated by Peter Doig and Parinaz Magidassi, followed by another exhibition "Caroline Coon: In The Arena" at J Hammond Projects in 2020. This period saw her also participate in important group shows, including the Hayward Gallery's 'Mixing It Up' (London 2021), Carl Freedman Gallery's 'Breakfast Under the Tree' (Margate, 2021), and Tate Britain's 'Women in Revolt' (2023).

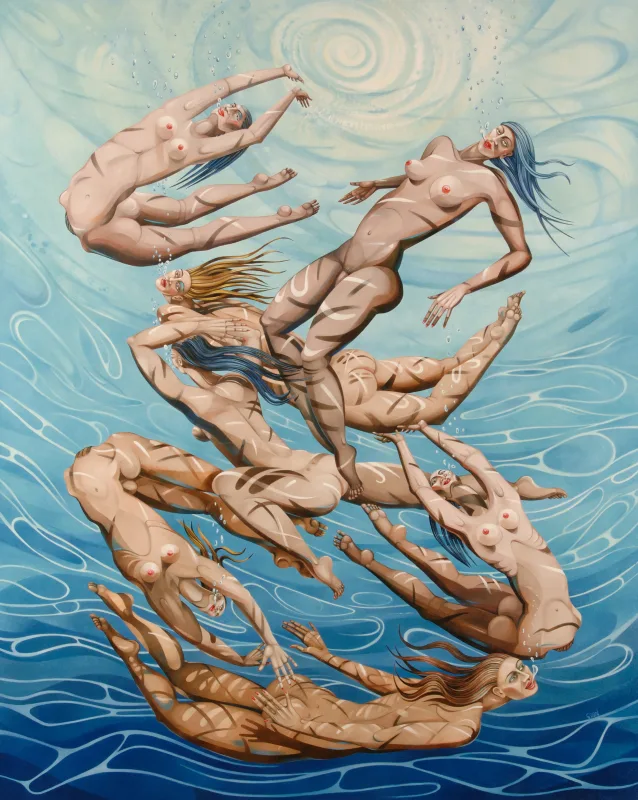
Caroline Coon 'Ocean' (2004) oil on canvas 152cm x 122cm (Private Collection)

In a 2019 interview with the TalkArt podcast, she told interviewers Robert Diament and Russell Tovey that on average she completes two large scale paintings, approximately 4ft by 5ft each, a year, alongside a wide variety of smaller paintings, and works on paper.

Many of her paintings can be grouped together into series, including her 'Nation Flag Series: The Price We Pay for Oil' — eg. 'A Flag for Syria' (2015), 'A Flag for Ana Mendieta' (2017) —, her Brothel Series paintings — eg. 'Between Parades' (1985), 'He Undresses In Another Hotel Room' (2002) and 'Cambridge Gardens: On Anywhere Street He Slips Unnoticed…' (2013-14). Her beach scenes featuring male nudes — eg. 'Adonis Beach' (1999), 'See, He Is Absolutely Gorgeous' (2002), 'Adonis, Grace and Fertility' (2003) — were shown together for the first time at Art Basel Miami by Stephen Friedman Gallery in December 2023. Since the solo exhibition "Love of Place" in 2022, she has been represented by Stephen Friedman Gallery.

== In popular culture ==
Since entering the public eye in the late 1960s as a leader of the Underground, Coon has frequently been referenced or portrayed in contemporary media. In 1976, she was profiled in the article 'Who are the She Males?' in The Daily Mirror. She has also appeared regularly on television and radio, including a controversial episode of Dee Time (1969) where she stated that the Virgin Mary was an insult to women, Read All About It (1976) with Melvyn Bragg, Into the 80s (1979) on Granada Television with Russell Harty, and a charged episode of BBC Two's The Late Show in 1993 where she corrected Waldemar Januszczak for his denigration of Pauline Boty as a "bad painter, just a dolly bird." Many documentaries in later years have explored her work with Release and her association with punk rock.

She is the inspiration for Matching Mole's song "O Caroline" by Robert Wyatt, and in her view Bob Dylan's "She Belongs to Me", although other women have also been identified as the subject of the song. In 1977, the 'take-down' rumour was spread by some male music journalists that the Stranglers' song "London Lady" was about her. In "Punky Business," a 1977 episode of The Goodies, Coon was satirised as Caroline Kook, a role played by Jane Asher. Coon was portrayed by Jemma Redgrave in Tony Palmer's 1991 television drama about the Oz obscenity case, The Trials of Oz.

In the late 1990s, Coon brought a landmark libel case, in which she represented herself, against the publisher Random House, following their publication of All Dressed Up: The Sixties and Counterculture (1998). The book contained allegations that anonymous young women who worked at Release offered sexual favours to major pop stars of the day, including George Harrison and Mick Jagger, in order to raise money for the organisation. Coon refuted the allegations, pointing out that it not only libelled the rock stars and her as Director of Release, but also the many young women who had been associated with the charity. Having seen the case through the High Court, in 2000 Coon won an apology from Random House, damages of £40,000 and legal fees of approximately £37,000. Coon donated part of her proceeds to digitising the Release archive at the Modern Records Centre, University of Warwick.

== Personal life ==
From her early years boarding at Legat Ballet School and the Royal Ballet School, both co-educational, Coon recognised her sexuality as bisexual. Since leaving school, she determined to live a single life – "a confirmed spinster" – albeit with lovers along the way. She made an early decision not to have children, assisted by the Abortion Act of 1967 that enabled her to have two legal abortions. She lives and works in London.

== Cunst Art Production books and films ==
Since the 1990s, Coon has maintained her own independent publishing imprint Cunst Art, though which she releases material like the pamphlet "Calling Women Whores Lets Rapists Go Free" (2005, co-authored with Amber Marks), the book 'Laid Bare' (2016) and the "Art-errorist Thorns" series, individual graphic works and texts. In 2000, Monika Parrinder compared this output "to the Atelier Populaire, who self-produced impromptu posters during the May 1968 revolution in Paris."

=== Selected Cunst Art publications and films ===
- Woman = Whore Questionnaire, (2002) – Pamphlet
- Calling Women Whores Lets Rapists Go Free, (2005) – Pamphlet
- The Fight for Democracy: Tahrir Square, January 2011, (2012) – Film
- Laid Bare – Diary – 1983-1984, (2016) - Limited Edition Art Book ISBN 978-1-5262-0608-4
- Laid Bare, (2018) – Film
- I AM WHORE, (2019) – Film
- Between Parades, How? Why?, (2024) – Film
- The Certainty Gift: to reduce violence against women and girls?, (2026) – Film

== Publications ==
- The Release Report on Drug Offenders and the Law. London: Sphere, 1969. With Rufus Harris. ISBN 0-7221-2445-7.
- 1988: The New Wave Punk Rock Explosion. London: Orbach & Chambers, 1977. ISBN 0-8015-6129-9.
- The Great Offender. London & New York: Tramps Gallery, 2019. With contributions from Maria Elena Busczek, Martin Green, James Lawler, Peter Doig & Parinaz Mogadassi. ISBN 978-1-5272-4487-0.

== See also ==
- Sex-positive feminism
- Sex-positive movement
