= The Best of Generation X =

Greatest hits album by Generation X
- Released: 1985
- Genre: Punk rock; pop punk
- Label: Chrysalis

Generation X chronology
Kiss Me Deadly (1981)	The Best of Generation X (1985)	The Idol Generation (1990)

Professional ratings
Review scores
Source	Rating
AllMusic	4/5 stars
MusicHound Rock: The Essential Album Guide	3/5 stars

The Best of Generation X is a compilation album of English punk rock band Generation X.

It was released by Chrysalis Records in 1985 in response to the international success that the band's frontman Billy Idol had recently achieved, as well as the media interest generated by bassist Tony James' then current project, Sigue Sigue Sputnik.

The album contains tracks from all three Generation X studio albums, and includes all of their singles except for debut single "Your Generation."

== Track listing ==
=== The Best of Generation X ===
All tracks are written by Billy Idol and Tony James; except where noted

No.	Title	Writer(s)	Length
1.	"Valley of the Dolls"		3:34
2.	"Running With the Boss Sound"	Idol, James, Bob Andrews	5:03
3.	"Night of the Cadillacs"		3:21
4.	"Fridays Angels"		3:17
5.	"One Hundred Punks"		3:07
6.	"King Rocker"		2:16
7.	"Wild Youth"		2:57
8.	"Dancing with Myself"		3:46
9.	"Triumph"		3:23
10.	"Revenge"		4:21
11.	"Youth Youth Youth"		6:04
12.	"From the Heart"		2:06
13.	"Ready Steady Go"		2:57
