= Kiss Me Deadly (album) =

Studio album by Gen X
- Released: 23 January 1981
- Studios: AIR, London
- Genres: New wave; post-punk
- Length: 37:44
- Label: Chrysalis
- Producer: Keith Forsey

Gen X chronology
Valley of the Dolls (1979)	Kiss Me Deadly (1981)	The Best of Generation X (1985)

Singles from Kiss Me Deadly
- 1. "Dancing with Myself" Released: October 1980

Professional ratings
Review scores
Source	Rating
AllMusic	3/5 stars

Kiss Me Deadly is the third studio album by the English punk rock and new wave band Gen X (previously known as Generation X). Produced by Keith Forsey, it was issued in the United Kingdom on 23 January 1981. It was the final album to be released before their disbandment, though they would briefly reunite in 1993.

Kiss Me Deadly failed on release to enter the UK Albums Chart, and Gen X broke up after the record's commercial failure.

== Theme ==
Kiss Me Deadly displayed a developing complexity in the songwriting partnership of lead singer Billy Idol and bassist Tony James, as they transitioned from their origins as musicians in the London punk rock scene of the late 1970s into a more sophisticatedly nuanced sound, and mature lyrical and thematic content, at the initiation of the British New Wave movement in 1980. The album's theme is the troubled complexities of life in the metropolitan Western World at the end of the 20th century, with reflections on city life, social isolation, narcotic abuse and drug dependency, and the ambition and exhilaration of youth.

The lyrics for "Dancing with Myself" were inspired by a 1979 visit to a Tokyo nightclub while the predecessor band Generation X were on tour in Japan, when Idol and James encountered the strange sight of young Japanese nightclubbers disco dancing with their own reflections in a mirror-walled venue rather than with one another. The song's lyrics reflect social isolation in a crowd and the youthful search for companionship with the opposite sex.

"Happy People" was inspired by a newspaper article about escalating use of the anti-depressant prescription drug Valium in contemporary British society.

Idol's lyrics for "Untouchables" reflected on his daydreaming at school about pop music stardom, being fascinated by its distant glamour; of the driving impulse to avoid the 9-to-5 employment existence of adulthood that lay beyond school years, and reflecting his fears of the potential for failure of his attempt at a professional career in pop music with a return to that world.

"Poison" was about Idol's increasing dalliance with heroin, and the psychological dangers that he sensed were present in the lifestyle that he had embarked upon in pursuance of pop music stardom.

"Heavens Inside" was written about Steve New, whom Idol and James had wanted to be Gen X's guitarist until they abandoned the idea due to New's narcotic addiction that rendered him a professional liability.

== Production ==
Kiss Me Deadly was recorded at AIR Studios in London in 1980, produced by Keith Forsey and engineered by Nigel Walker.

Several of its songs were salvaged from Generation X's 1979 recording sessions at Olympic Studios for that band's abortive third album, during which they had acrimoniously broken up (the original recording sessions were retrospectively released in 1998 under the title Sweet Revenge). Idol and James, Generation X's singer/frontman and bassist, had afterwards rebranded the act with a new drummer (Terry Chimes), a modified name and a conversion into the nascent New Romantic movement's look and sound.

The album title was taken from an earlier Generation X song, one of the signature tunes of the band's early repertoire, and was intended to signal a return to the lyrical content of that period (i.e. "singing about things we knew about personally"), after what was perceived to be the artistic false step of the band's second album, Valley of the Dolls (1979).

Gen X were without a lead guitarist during the recording of Kiss Me Deadly, and utilized prominent guest guitarists John McGeoch, Steve Jones, Steve New and Danny Kustow, the latter two not being formally credited on the sleeve. Guitarist James Stevenson was credited on the sleeve as being in the band, but joined after the album had been recorded and did not play on the record. On several of the songs, different guitarists worked in combination, alternating between lead and rhythm, creating a dynamic fusion of differing playing styles.

"McGeoch said, 'Oh I'll come down and help out'. He rehearsed for three weeks and did the majority of the record with us. Jonesy came back from Thailand and supplied 'Bollocks' on some tracks - patented Jonesy 'Bollocks' - and he was really good on the raunchy stuff. Danny Kustow did a bit on the ("Dancing With Myself") single". "It's Steve New playing lead guitar on the single Dancing with Myself, playing the lick and the solo, and he plays it brilliantly". – Tony James

"John McGeoch was an incredible guitarist, he really helped to bring the album to life". – Billy Idol

== Singles releases ==
The album's sole single, "Dancing with Myself", reached number 62 on the UK Singles Chart on pre-release ahead of the album in October 1980.

== Cover art ==
The record's cover was photographed by Brian Aris.

== Track listing ==
=== Original LP (1981) ===
All tracks are written by Billy Idol and Tony James, except where noted.

Side 1
No.	Title	Writer(s)	Length
1.	"Dancing with Myself"		3:45
2.	"Untouchables"	Idol	3:37
3.	"Happy People"		4:28
4.	"Heavens Inside"	Idol	2:56
5.	"Triumph"	Idol	3:24

Side 2
No.	Title	Writer(s)	Length
1.	"Revenge"		4:19
2.	"Stars Look Down"		4:39
3.	"What Do You Want"		4:04
4.	"Poison"		2:59
5.	"Oh Mother"	Idol, James, Terry Chimes	3:33

2005 bonus CD tracks
No.	Title	Length
11.	"Hubble, Bubble, Toil and Dubble" (B-side to 1981 "Dancing with Myself" 12")	8:28
12.	"Loopy Dub" (B-side to 1980 "Dancing with Myself" 12")	5:04
13.	"Ugly Dub" (B-side to 1980 "Dancing with Myself" 12")	3:07
14.	"From the Heart" (From Live at the Paris Theatre '78 & '81)	2:19
15.	"Andy Warhol" (From Live at the Paris Theatre '78 & '81)	3:28

== Personnel ==
Gen X

- Billy Idol − vocals, guitar
- Tony James − bass guitar
- Terry Chimes − drums
- James Stevenson − guitar (credited on sleeve but didn't participate in the recording)

with:

- John McGeoch − lead and rhythm guitars (tracks 3–10)
- Steve Jones − additional guitar (tracks 1, 2)
- Danny Kustow − additional guitar (track 1)
- Steve New − lead guitar (tracks 1, 2)

Technical

- Nigel Walker − engineer "at the controls"
- Rick Isbell − engineer "button man and key grip"
- Brian Aris − photography
