= Bromley Contingent =

Early punk rock figures

The Bromley Contingent were a group of followers of the Sex Pistols. The name was coined by Melody Maker journalist Caroline Coon, after the town of Bromley where some of them lived. They helped popularise the fashion of the early UK punk movement.

== Members ==
The core members of the group included Siouxsie Sioux, Steven Severin, Billy Idol, Simon 'Six' Barker, Debbie Juvenile (née Wilson), Linda Ashby, Philip Sallon, Simone Thomas, Bertie 'Berlin' Marshall, Tracie O'Keefe, and Sharon Hayman. Soo Catwoman, another early punk aficionado, is often described as a member in later press, though Catwoman and members of the Bromley Contingent including Berlin later dispute this stating, "no one liked her" and "she wasn't even from Bromley".

== History ==
The term Bromley Contingent first appeared in the UK music press after the Sex Pistols' gig in Paris on 3 September 1976, when journalist Caroline Coon decided to write an article about "the fans rather about the band". The label was a bit of a misnomer as some members came from other places, including Kentish Town and Burnt Oak. Of those with a Bromley connection, Siouxsie was from Chislehurst and Idol had lived in Orpington. Severin, Barker and Berlin came from other parts of Bromley. Severin stated: "we certainly never referred to ourselves as that". Siouxsie said: "After we got back from Paris, resentments from some of the other people we used to see began to creep in. Those people all thought we'd called ourselves the Bromley Contingent, when we hadn't".

The Bromley Contingent attained a degree of notoriety on 1 December 1976 when Siouxsie, Severin, Thomas and Barker appeared on ITV with the Sex Pistols on Thames Television's early evening television programme Today. Interviewed by television journalist Bill Grundy, Sex Pistols singer Johnny Rotten used the word "shit". Siouxsie then told Grundy, "I've always wanted to meet you", to which he replied; "Did you really? We'll meet afterwards, shall we?" This comment provoked guitarist Steve Jones to call Grundy a "dirty sod", a "dirty old man", a "dirty bastard", a "dirty fucker" and a "fucking rotter".

That was the first time in the history of UK television that viewers had heard swearing at this hour of the day. Although the programme was only seen in the Thames Television region, the ensuing furore occupied the tabloid newspapers for days and, shortly afterwards, the Sex Pistols were dropped by their record label, EMI. This episode changed the face of music in Britain. Up until December 1976, punk rock was a relatively low-key fashion, apart from appearing from time to time in small parts in music papers. In the following week, Siouxsie appeared on the front page of the Daily Mirror with the legend "Siouxsie's a Punk Shocker". The last time Siouxsie and Severin attended a Sex Pistols gig was at Notre Dame Hall in London on 15 December 1976.

The notoriety of the Bromley Contingent in the press continued in June 1977, when Sex Pistols manager Malcolm McLaren rented a boat for the band and fans to sail down the River Thames during Queen Elizabeth II's Silver Jubilee anniversary celebration. When the police forced the boat to dock, several Pistols fans were arrested and injured in the melee. Bromley Contingent members Debbie Juvenile and Tracie O'Keefe (both employees of McLaren in his King's Road clothing boutique Seditionaries) were charged with obstruction and assaulting a police officer. Juvenile was acquitted. O'Keefe was sentenced to one month's imprisonment, later acquitted on appeal. O'Keefe died unexpectedly in early 1978 of bone marrow cancer at the age of 18.

=== Aftermath ===
Many of the Bromley Contingent went on to form bands themselves: Siouxsie and Severin respectively became singer and bassist of Siouxsie and the Banshees and Idol became the leader of Generation X. The fashion statements made by Siouxsie, in particular, incorporating fetish and bondage clothing, and her innovative style of makeup, had a lasting influence.

Barker became a photographer, using the nickname 'Six'. Bertie 'Berlin' Marshall became a writer, publishing a novel, Psychoboys in 1999 and a memoir Berlin Bromley in 2001 which received favourable reviews from The Guardian and Time Out London magazine. Philip Sallon became a fixture of the New Romantic club scene in the early 1980s alongside the likes of Steve Strange and Boy George.

== Suggested viewing ==
- Arena: Punk and the Pistols (1995, dir. Paul Tickell) - Documentary featuring 'in depth' interviews of the members by the BBC
