= Generation X (1964 book) =

1964 book by Jane Deverson and Charles Hamblett

- Author: Jane Deverson and Charles Hamblett
- Language: English
- Publisher: Anthony Gibbs & Phillips Ltd.
- Publication date: 1964
- Publication place: United Kingdom
- Pages: 192 pp.
- OCLC: 828705

Generation X is a 1964 192-page book on popular youth culture by British journalists Jane Deverson and Charles Hamblett. It contains interviews with teenagers who were part of the Mod subculture. It began as a series of interviews in a 1964 study of British youth, commissioned by British lifestyle magazine Woman's Own where Deverson worked. The interviews detailed a culture of promiscuous and anti-establishment youth, and was seen as inappropriate for the magazine.

== Cultural influences ==
Generation X, a punk rock band that English musician Billy Idol formed in 1976, was named after the book—a copy of which was owned by Idol's mother.
