= Anthology (Generation X compilation) =

Box set by Generation X
- Released: 25 February 2003
- Recorded: 1977–81
- Genre: Pop punk, post-punk, New Romantic, rock
- Length: 3:15:01
- Label: EMI

Generation X chronology
Radio 1 Sessions (2002)	Anthology (2003)	Live at Sheffield (2003)

Anthology is a three-CD boxed set of recordings from pop punk band Generation X. Released in 2003, it features a selection of tracks from the band's three studio albums, the band's abortive third studio album, entitled Sweet Revenge, and a 1979 live recording from Osaka, Japan. Also featured are several studio rarities, alternate mixes, and an interview recorded with bassist Tony James.

== Track listing ==
=== Disc 1 ===
All tracks are written by Billy Idol and Tony James; except where noted

No.	Title	Writer(s)	Length
1.	"Dancing with Myself"		3:47
2.	"Fridays Angels"		3:16
3.	"Your Generation"		3:14
4.	"Ready, Steady, Go"		2:58
5.	"Untouchables"	Idol	3:39
6.	"Valley of the Dolls"		3:33
7.	"Day By Day" (BBC Radio 1 session.)		2:24
8.	"Wild Youth"		2:52
9.	"Prime of Kenny Silvers (Parts 1 & 2)"		7:17
10.	"Wild Dub"		3:48
11.	"One Hundred-Punks"		3:07
12.	"King Rocker"		2:17
13.	"Kiss Me Deadly"		4:23
14.	"Gimme Some Truth" (BBC Radio 1 session.)	John Lennon	2:22
15.	"New Order"		2:22
16.	"English Dream"		5:00
17.	"Youth, Youth, Youth"		6:07
18.	"Rock 'n' Roll"	Jimmy Page, Robert Plant	3:03
19.	"The Hunter"	Booker T. Jones, Chappell, Steve Cropper, Donald "Duck" Dunn, Al Jackson, Jr.	4:39

=== Disc 2 - Sweet Revenge ===
All tracks are written by Billy Idol and Tony James except where noted

No.	Title	Writer(s)	Length
1.	"Triumph"		5:09
2.	"Dancing with Myself"		3:46
3.	"Girls"		3:03
4.	"Modern Boys"		3:23
5.	"Cathy Come Home"		3:49
6.	"Revenge"		5:38
7.	"Flash as Hell"		2:28
8.	"Anna Smiles"		2:28
9.	"Psycho Beat"		3:35
10.	"Stars Looked Down"		4:43
11.	"I Dig Everything" (Booklet incorrectly credits Idol and James.)	David Bowie	3:08
12.	"Dancing with My Wealth"		5:05
13.	"Exclusive Interview with Tony James"		17:49

=== Disc 3 - Live in Osaka 1979 ===
All tracks are written by Billy Idol and Tony James; except where noted

No.	Title	Writer(s)	Length
1.	"Ready Steady Go"		3:35
2.	"This Heat" (Mislabeled as "Trying for Kicks".)		2:32
3.	"English Dream"		4:46
4.	"Triumph"		4:39
5.	"Anna Smiles"		2:40
6.	"Night of the Cadillacs"		3:21
7.	"No No No"		2:08
8.	"Valley of the Dolls"		3:37
9.	"Revenge"		4:25
10.	"Kiss Me Deadly"		4:51
11.	"Friday's Angel"		3:11
12.	"Wild Youth"		2:28
13.	"Day By Day"		2:34
14.	"King Rocker"		2:20
15.	"Your Generation"		4:48
16.	"Rock 'n' Roll"	Page, Plant	3:01
17.	"Shakin' All Over"	Johnny Kidd, Gus Robinson	3:14
18.	"Youth, Youth, Youth"		1:46
19.	"Outro"		1:04
