= Generation X (album) =

Studio album by Generation X
- Released: 17 March 1978
- Recorded: November–December 1977
- Studios: TW Studios, Fulham, London
- Genres: Punk rock; pop punk
- Length: 36:51
- Label: Chrysalis
- Producer: Martin Rushent

Generation X chronology
Generation X (1978)	Valley of the Dolls (1979)

Singles from Generation X
- 1. "Ready Steady Go" Released: February 1978

Generation X is the debut studio album by the English punk rock band Generation X, produced by Martin Rushent, it was released in the United Kingdom on 17 March 1978.

== Production ==
Generation X was recorded at TW Studios in Fulham, West London, during November–December 1977, with the producer Martin Rushent and the engineer Alan Winstanley.

The band had previously worked with the producer Phil Wainman on prior singles, but had been dissatisfied with the results, critiquing his production as too "poppy" and polished, and sought a recorded sound for the album that resembled the band's live performances. Frontman Billy Idol suggested Rushent for the role as he had been impressed with his recent work with the Stranglers. Guitarist Derwood Andrews later recalled, "Martin Rushent told great jokes, but his engineer Alan Winstanley was more responsible for the sound of the album".

The album was recorded during one week, with many of the songs being completed in one take. Bassist Tony James wrote most of the lyrics, with Idol composing the music. Andrews and drummer Mark Laff finished the songs by adding instrumental parts.

"We (recorded) it in TW (Studios), and it was like recording in a garage, it was such a shithole. But it was great as we felt completely at home, we just plugged in and played great and it sounded great. ... 'Youth Youth Youth' was done in one take, we just set Derwood up with a wall of speakers in the studio, no headphones and just left the tape running. We were pissed, and did it at midnight, that's the only way we could have possibly recorded that track. He just went mad, we just all sat there in awe as he went crazy (playing that solo)." − Tony James

== Critical reception ==
Professional ratings
Review scores
Source	Rating
AllMusic	4/5 stars
Classic Pop	3/5 stars
Classic Rock	8/10
Pitchfork	8.7/10
Record Collector	4/5 stars
Record Mirror	5/5 stars
The Rolling Stone Album Guide	3.5/5 stars
Sounds	4/5 stars
Uncut	6/10
The Village Voice	B+

In a retrospective review, AllMusic critic Tim Sendra called Generation X "a bright and shiny artifact of the punk rock era that lacks any fat, slack moments, or serious politics ... Being bubblegum punk ain't all bad though. Especially when the songs are as sharp, the performances as lively, and the sound as wiry and tough as it is here."

== Charts ==
In March 1978 the album reached No. 29 in the Albums Chart.

== Single releases ==
The song "Ready Steady Go" was issued as a single in February 1978 prior to the album's release, peaking at #47 in the United Kingdom's Singles Chart.

== Cover art ==
The band portrait used as the front cover was photographed by Gered Mankowitz.

== Release formats ==
The original U.S. release of the album featured a variant track listing, omitting three songs and adding three songs from the band's singles releases, with the addition of a cover of John Lennon's "Gimme Some Truth".

The album was later remastered and reissued in 2002 with the original UK track listing, augmented by six bonus tracks from singles.

Two outtakes recorded during the TW Studios sessions for Generation X, "Your Generation" and "Rock On", were retrospectively commercially issued on the 2004 K.M.D - Sweet Revenge Xtra album.

The album was re-issued internationally on 26 April 2019 as a part of a 2-CD/3-LP Deluxe collector's set, re-mastered by its original engineer Alan Winstanley. The bonus CD/two bonus LPs featured a-side and b-sides tracks from singles, outtakes, and previously unreleased mixes.

== Track listing ==
=== Original UK LP (1978) ===
All tracks are written by Billy Idol and Tony James.

No.	Title	Length
1.	"From the Heart"	2:08
2.	"One Hundred Punks"	3:08
3.	"Listen"	3:24
4.	"Ready Steady Go"	2:58
5.	"Kleenex"	2:06
6.	"Promises Promises"	5:18
7.	"Day by Day"	2:05
8.	"The Invisible Man"	2:56
9.	"Kiss Me Deadly"	4:24
10.	"Too Personal"	2:17
11.	"Youth Youth Youth"	6:07

2002 CD bonus tracks
No.	Title	Length
12.	"Your Generation" (single)	3:15
13.	"Wild Youth" (single)	2:53
14.	"Wild Dub" (B-side to "Wild Youth")	3:49
15.	"Trying for Kicks" (B-side to "Friday's Angels")	2:00
16.	"This Heat" (B-side to "Friday's Angels")	2:12

2019 Deluxe Edition bonus CD/2-LP
No.	Title	Length
1.	"Your Generation"	3:15
2.	"Day by Day" (alternate version)	2:04
3.	"Wild Youth"	2:55
4.	"Wild Dub"	3:49
5.	"No No No"	2:10
6.	"Trying for Kicks"	2:00
7.	"This Heat"	2:12
8.	"Ready Steady Go" (Phil Wainman version)	3:04
9.	"No No No" (Phil Wainman version)	2:21
10.	"Gimme Some Truth" (outtake)	2:53
11.	"Rock On Dub" (outtake)	2:53
12.	"Promises Promises" (single version)	3:42
13.	"From the Heart" (Alan Winstanley mix)	2:13
14.	"The Invisible Man" (Alan Winstanley mix)	3:04
15.	"Kleenex" (Alan Winstanley mix)	2:14
16.	"Day by Day" (Alan Winstanley mix)	2:09
17.	"One Hundred Punks" (Alan Winstanley mix)	3:17
18.	"Too Personal" (Alan Winstanley mix)	2:23
19.	"Youth Youth Youth" (Alan Winstanley mix)	6:20

=== Original US LP (1978) ===
All tracks are written by Idol and James, except where noted.

No.	Title	Writer(s)	Length
1.	"Gimme Some Truth" (outtake from TW Studios sessions)	John Lennon	2:48
2.	"Wild Youth"		2:52
3.	"From the Heart"		2:06
4.	"Ready Steady Go"		2:56
5.	"Kleenex"		2:05
6.	"Promises Promises"		5:18
7.	"Day by Day"		2:04
8.	"One Hundred Punks"		3:05
9.	"Your Generation"		3:11
10.	"Kiss Me Deadly"		4:12
11.	"Wild Dub"		3:47
12.	"Youth Youth Youth"		6:00

== Personnel ==
Generation X

- Billy Idol − vocals
- Tony James − bass, vocals
- Bob "Derwood" Andrews − guitar, vocals
- Mark Laff − drums, vocals

Technical

- Alan Winstanley – engineer
- Gered Mankowitz – photography, design concept

== Appearances in popular culture ==
The song "Kiss Me Deadly" was used in the soundtrack of the movie SLC Punk (1998).
