= Valley of the Dolls (album) =

Studio album by Generation X
- Released: 26 January 1979
- Studios: Wessex Sound, London
- Genres: Punk rock; glam punk
- Length: 38:16
- Label: Chrysalis
- Producer: Ian Hunter

Generation X chronology
Generation X (1978)	Valley of the Dolls (1979)	Kiss Me Deadly (1981)

Singles from Generation X
- 1. "King Rocker" Released: 12 January 1979; 2. "Valley of the Dolls" Released: 30 March 1979; 3. "Fridays Angels" Released: 15 June 1979

Professional ratings
Review scores
Source	Rating
AllMusic	2/5 stars
Christgau's Record Guide	C+
Music Week	3/4 stars
The Rolling Stone Album Guide	2.5/5 stars
Smash Hits	5/10

Valley of the Dolls is the second studio album by the English punk rock band Generation X. It was produced by Ian Hunter.

== Production ==
Valley of the Dolls was recorded at Wessex Sound Studios in Islington in October 1978. The record's working title was 'Intercourse (Old Meets New)', which was superseded by a name taken from a 1966 novel. Ian Hunter was commissioned as the record's producer at Tony James's request, from having been a fan of his work with Mott the Hoople in the early 1970s.

The record was Generation X's second long-player release, and displayed the band transitioning from its origins in the London punk rock scene of the late-1970s into a more mainstream rock music sound, with the incorporation of musical influences ranging from glam rock, progressive rock, and Bruce Springsteen's mid-1970s work, and was in part aimed at providing the band with a means of entry into the United States market, and gearing up the scale of the band's sound to move from playing in club venues to theatres and arenas.

In pre-release music press interviews for the record Billy Idol presented it as a departure from the punk movement by the band:

"I think with this album we've exorcised the ghost of punk rock, people always saw punk as unmusical, and we aim to show that we've got ideas, and that we're individuals and not just following what everyone else does. Generation X is its own band. This LP is a lot different from our last, which didn't have enough staying power, this new one doesn't wear off so easily and we think it will last longer."

On release in January 1979 the record performed disappointingly in the UK Albums Chart, and contributed substantially to Generation X's demise as a band at the year's end. In a later interview with the New Musical Express, bassist and composer/co-lyricist Tony James attributed the record's failure commercially and artistically to:

"I was in love with the rock and roll myth. I'd read (Mick Farren's novel) The Tale of Willy's Rats, and thought it was wonderful. I certainly had a romantic vision of rock and roll groups, and I think with the Valley of the Dolls album we reached an all time bottom in that rock and roll romanticism. After the album came out I realised that I'd been talking about things that I didn't really understand, or which even were just not true. Afterwards we realised we had to sing about what we knew about, not what we wished we were."

Concerns from the record's producer Ian Hunter about the technical competence of Generation X's drummer led to the employment for the recording sessions of Jethro Tull's Clive Bunker as a session musician. Bunker and Laff played together on the tracks, achieving a distinctive double-drum sound.

== Singles releases ==
The album contained the UK singles: "King Rocker", which reached #11 in the UK Singles Chart in January 1979; "Valley of the Dolls", which reached #23 in April, and "Fridays Angels" in June 1979, which failed to enter the top 40.

== Chart performance ==
On release the Valley of the Dolls long-player reached No. 51 in the UK Albums Chart.

== Track listing ==
=== Original LP (1979) ===
All tracks are written by Billy Idol and Tony James, except where noted.

Side one
No.	Title	Writer(s)	Length
1.	"Running with the Boss Sound"	Idol, James, Bob Andrews	5:03
2.	"Night of the Cadillacs"		3:20
3.	"Paradise West"		5:28
4.	"Fridays Angels"		3:19
5.	"King Rocker"		2:16

Side two
No.	Title	Length
1.	"Valley of the Dolls"	3:34
2.	"English Dream"	4:57
3.	"Love Like Fire"	3:02
4.	"The Prime of Kenny Silvers (Part One)"	3:55
5.	"The Prime of Kenny Silvers (Part Two)"	3:22

2002 Bonus CD Tracks
No.	Title	Writer(s)	Length
11.	"Gimme Some Truth" (B-Side to "King Rocker".)	John Lennon	2:23
12.	"Shakin' All Over" (B-Side to "Valley of the Dolls".)	Johnny Kidd, Gus Robinson	2:45

== Personnel ==
Generation X

- Billy Idol − vocals
- Tony James − bass, vocals
- Bob "Derwood" Andrews − guitar, vocals
- Mark Laff − drums, vocals

Additional musician

- Clive Bunker – additional drums on "Running with the Boss Sound", "Night of the Cadillacs" and "King Rocker".

Technical

- Gary Edwards – engineer
- Peter Wagg – art direction
- Janusz Guttner – design
- Rod Delroy, Paddy Eckersley – photography
