= Gimme Some Truth =

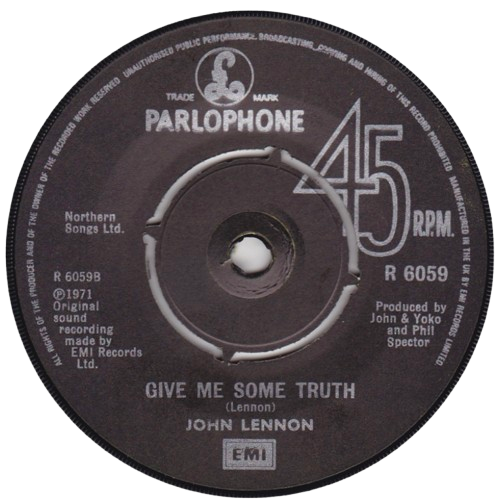
- UK single B-side label

Song by John Lennon

from the album Imagine
- Released: 9 September 1971
- Recorded: 25 May – 5 July 1971
- Studio: Ascot Sound Studios, Berkshire; Record Plant, New York City
- Genre: Rock
- Length: 3:18
- Label: Apple
- Songwriters: John Lennon, uncredited lyrical contributions by Paul McCartney
- Producers: John Lennon, Yoko Ono, Phil Spector

"Gimme Some Truth" (originally spelled "Give Me Some Truth") is a protest song written and performed by John Lennon. It was first released on his 1971 album Imagine. "Gimme Some Truth" contains various political references emerging from the time it was written, during the latter years of the Vietnam War. Co-produced by Phil Spector, the recording includes a slide guitar solo played by George Harrison, Lennon's former bandmate in the Beatles.

In 1982, "Gimme Some Truth" was issued as the B-side of "Love" on a posthumous single. The song provided the title track for the 2000 documentary film Gimme Some Truth: The Making of John Lennon's Imagine Album.

== Origins ==
Work on the song began as early as January 1969 during the Beatles' Get Back sessions, which would eventually evolve into Let It Be. Bootleg recordings of the group performing songs that would eventually go onto the members' solo recordings feature a few performances of "Gimme Some Truth". A recording of the Beatles performing the song was officially released in 2021, appearing on the Let It Be: 50th Anniversary Edition reissue, and in The Beatles: Get Back documentary.

Side Two starts with 'Gimme Some Truth' which is one I started a year or two back—probably in India. We wrote a lot there. It was an old lick that I had around a long time but I again changed the lyrics. I like the track because it sounds good but it didn't get much attention, so it's a personal track that I like the sound of. The guitars are good and the voice sounds nice and, you know, and it says whatever it says. George does a sharp solo with his steel finger (he's not too proud of it, but I like it).

— J. Lennon

== Lyrics ==
"Gimme Some Truth" conveys Lennon's frustration with deceptive politicians ("short-haired yellow-bellied sons of Tricky Dicky"), hypocrisy, and chauvinism ("tight-lipped condescending mommy's little chauvinists"). The lyrics encapsulate some widely held feelings of the time, when many people were participating in protest rallies against their governments.

The song also uses a reference to the nursery rhyme "Old Mother Hubbard" (about a woman going to get her dog a bone, only to discover that her cupboard is empty) as a verb. The mention of "soft-soap" employs that slang verb in its classic sense − namely, insincere flattery that attempts to convince someone to do or to think something, as in the case of politicians who use specious or beguiling rhetoric to quell public unrest or to propagandise unfairly.

Lennon employs the recurring lyric "Money for rope/Money for dope", the former phrase being a variation of the British idiom "Money for old rope" (a profit obtained by little or no effort). According to Peter Jackson, it was Paul McCartney who came up with this line during the Get Back sessions. Jackson showed McCartney the footage from his documentary of the Beatles performing the song, who had no memory of working on it. Lennon stated in unused notes for Imagine that the middle eight was "written with McCartney."

== Reception ==
In a review of the Imagine album, music critic Robert Christgau said that the song "unites Lennon unmasked with the Lennon of Blunderland wordplay as it provides a rationale for 'Jealous Guy,' which doesn't need one, and 'How Do You Sleep?,' which may". Lisa Wright of the NME ranked "Gimme Some Truth" as Lennon's fifth greatest solo song, stating that in the song Lennon "tried to sift through the maelstrom of media bullshit to find the light at the end of the tunnel" and concluding that "scorn never sounded so good". Classic Rock critic Rob Hughes rated "Gimme Some Truth" as Lennon's greatest political song, saying "Lennon is at his acerbic best here, taking potshots at hypocrites, bigots, prima donnas and White House incumbent, Richard Nixon: 'No short-haired, yellow-bellied, son of Tricky Dicky/Is gonna Mother Hubbard soft-soap me/With just a pocketful of hope/Money for dope/Money for rope.'” Ultimate Classic Rock critic Nick DeRiso rated it as Lennon's 3rd greatest solo political song, and praised its "brilliant wordplay."

== Recording ==
Lennon recorded "Gimme Some Truth" on 25 May 1971 at Ascot Sound Studios. Overdubbing of his lead vocal on 28 May was also captured on film.

Author Robert Rodriguez comments that Imagine is well known for its commercial qualities and "radio-friendly fare", but on the more substantial tracks, George Harrison provides "some of the grittiest playing", particularly on "Gimme Some Truth". Rodriguez highlights Harrison's slide guitar solo as being "equally [as] stinging" as his playing on "How Do You Sleep?" and describes the track as an "acidic attack on governmental hypocrisy".

== Personnel ==
- John Lennon – vocals, electric guitar
- George Harrison – electric guitar, slide guitar
- Nicky Hopkins – piano
- Rod Linton – acoustic guitar
- Andy Davis – acoustic guitar
- Klaus Voormann – bass
- Alan White – drums

== Cover versions and performances by other artists ==
- Generation X recorded it as a B-side to the single "King Rocker" in 1978. It appeared on the US release of their eponymous first album and also appears as a bonus track on the remastered version of 1979's Valley of the Dolls.
- The Wonder Stuff included "Gimme Some Truth" on the expanded version of the 1989 album Hup.
- Sam Phillips recorded a version for her 1994 album Martinis & Bikinis.
- Ash released it as a B-side to "Angel Interceptor" in 1995.
- Travis's version is a B-side to "More Than Us", released in 1998, and also appears on the various artists compilation Causes 1 released in 2011.
- On the 2007 compilation album Instant Karma: The Amnesty International Campaign to Save Darfur, the Wallflowers' frontman Jakob Dylan (son of Bob Dylan) covers the song and Dhani Harrison (son of George Harrison) reprises his father's role as lead guitarist. Mexican group Jaguares made another cover version for the same album.
- Primal Scream recorded the song as a B-side to their "Country Girl" single in 2006, in the style of the Generation X cover.
- Matthew Sweet and Susanna Hoffs released a version on their 2009 collaboration Under the Covers, Vol. 2.
- Cheap Trick released a cover of "Gimme Some Truth" as a single in 2019. It appears on their 2021 album In Another World.
- On 8 December 2019, the Full Story Band, featuring KT Tunstall, released a version of "Gimme Some Truth" in aid of the War Child charity.
- In the summer of 2020, Billie Joe Armstrong of Green Day posted a cover of the song on his Instagram page. The punk band Anti-Flag also recorded a version.
- During the Covid lockdown in 2020, Mike Portnoy released Gimme Some Truth (MPTV Version) on YouTube to celebrate John Lennon's 80th Birthday.
- Kula Shaker released a cover of "Gimme Some Truth" as a single on 4 November 2022.

== Other works named after the song ==
- A 2000 direct-to-video documentary film showing the recording sessions and evolution of Imagine took its title, Gimme Some Truth: The Making of John Lennon's Imagine Album, from this song.
- Jon Wiener took the title of this song for his 1999 book, Gimme Some Truth: The John Lennon FBI Files, about Nixon's attempt to deport Lennon in 1972.
- The title is used for a 2020 compilation album of Lennon's greatest songs, remixed from scratch by his son Sean. The album was released on 9 October 2020, John Lennon's 80th birthday.
- The Australian rock’n’roll band Money for Rope took its name from the song lyrics.
