= Generation X (band) =

English punk rock band

- Generation X, 1977. L-R: Billy Idol, Tony James, Bob Andrews, and Mark Laff

Background information
- Also known as: Gen X
- Origin: Chelsea, London, England
- Genres: Punk rock; new wave; pop-punk
- Years active: 1976–1981, 1993
- Label: Chrysalis
- Spinoff of: Chelsea
- Past members: Billy Idol; Tony James; John Towe; Derwood Andrews; Mark Laff; Terry Chimes; James Stevenson

Generation X (later known as Gen X) were an English punk rock band, formed in London in 1976. They were the musical starting point of the career of their frontman Billy Idol, and issued six singles that made the UK singles chart and two albums that reached the UK Albums Chart.

== History ==
=== Formation ===
During the punk rock movement in London in late 1976, William Broad (aka Billy Idol), a 21-year-old guitar-playing university drop-out from Bromley and associate of the Bromley Contingent; the drummer John Towe, a West End music shop assistant; and – at Broad's suggestion, having already met via an advertisement previously placed in the Melody Maker by Broad seeking other musicians – Tony James, a 23-year-old university graduate bass player from Twickenham and former member of the London S.S. all replied to an advert placed in the Melody Maker by John Krivine, the owner of a fashion clothing shop called Acme Attractions on the King's Road in Chelsea, seeking musicians to form a new West London band around the vocalist/frontman John O'Hara aka Gene October. After a few weeks of rehearsals the band became known as Chelsea, and began by playing a few support gigs in West London and Manchester, primarily playing cover versions of rock and roll songs from the 1960s. However, by November, Gene October felt that Broad and James were becoming too dominant creatively and were beginning to make music that he considered too lightweight, and that his personal chemistry with them was not good – a feeling which they reciprocated. Consequently, Broad and James along with Towe abandoned Chelsea (jettisoning October on stage from the line-up in the midst of a gig), and formed a new band called Generation X, named after the title of a book belonging to Broad's mother, that James found when visiting his family home. The new band was initially managed by Andrew Czezowski, Acme Attractions' accountant.

With his photogenic looks and egotism, Broad – styling himself with a punk pseudonym of "Billy Idol" – abandoned the guitar to be the frontman and lead singer of the new unit. When the 17 year old lead guitarist Bob "Derwood" Andrews was recruited from the Fulham rocker band Paradox, 'Generation X' took the stage for the first time in public at the Central School of Art and Design on 10 December 1976. The new band played its second gig four days later at the newly opened The Roxy, which Czezowski had also begun managing. Generation X was the first band to play at the venue. Soon after formation Generation X abandoned playing cover versions in its live performances around London, and began writing its own material, with Idol writing music around James' lyrical song constructions.

=== 1977–1978 ===
In early 1977, the management for the band was passed from Czezowoski, who preferred club management to live acts, to a dual management of Stewart Joseph, a fanzine promoter from Rough Trade Records, with the Sounds journalist Jonh Ingham, who professionalized the act's business aspect, and began approaching record companies to secure a recording deal.

On 16 February 1977, the band went into a studio for the first time to record a demo session of five songs at De Lane Lea Studios in Wembley, North London, sponsored by Chiswick Records. The lyrics of some of the songs possessed a partially politicized tone (with a critique of The National Front, and The Troubles) that the band would abandon after its early months. Later in the year, Generation X's first record was released by the band itself in the form of an unmarked white label for promotional purposes, with the song "Your Generation" as its A-side, and "Listen" as the B-side, taken from the De Lane Lea demo session. 250 copies were initially pressed, followed by another 500 copies, all in unmarked white paper sleeves.

In mid-March 1977, amidst a heavy performance schedule in London and increasingly beyond the confines of the capital city into England's provinces, a gig had to be abandoned at the University of Leicester mid-performance, due to Derwood Andrews requiring hospitalization from being struck on the head by a beer bottle thrown from the crowd. In mid-April 1977, having just played their first international date in Paris in a joint billing alongside the upcoming bands The Jam and The Police, and recorded their first live radio session at the British Broadcasting Corporation's Maida Vale Studios, John Towe was asked to leave the band by James and Idol as they felt that his style of playing was too overt for what they wanted from a drummer, and James, the band's strategist, had come to the view that Towe's personality did not fit with the image that he was formulating for the band. Towe moved on to join a new outfit called Alternative TV. He was replaced on drums by the 18 year old Mark Laff from North Finchley, recruited from Subway Sect after an extensive audition process for the vacancy organized by Idol and James in May 1977. From June to August 1977 in between gigs the band practiced in a rehearsal space in the basement beneath a Beggars Banquet record shop in the Fulham Road.

In mid-July Generation X signed a recording contract with Chrysalis Records, and went into Wessex Sound Studios in North London for the band's first formal recording session for commercial release. Under the supervision of the producer Bill Price the session proved to be abortive due to the band being unhappy with the results, and Chrysalis Records sought another producer, which it found in Phil Wainman. At the end of July 1977, the band worked with Wainman at Morgan Studios in Willesden, recording its first single "Your Generation". Wainman was not impressed with the musical ability of the band, particularly with Laff's technical proficiency or with Idol's capacity as a singer, and in response to Idol asking for his opinion during production as to whether he thought Generation X were "going to make it", answered with some dubiety. On release at the start of September 1977, "Your Generation", with a b-side of the high-energy disaffected punk-rock song "Day by Day" (with a title taken by James from the recent publication of Robin Day's autobiography), went to No. 36 in the UK singles chart, after being critiqued by Elton John in a review column in the Record Mirror as 'dreadful garbage'. The band played the song on Marc Bolan's afternoon variety show, Marc, a few days later using Granada Television's Manchester studio instruments for the performance, afterwards making off with the drum-kit and being banned by Granada for 10 years as a result.

Along with writing and performing the band's musical output, James and Idol around this period sought to extend the band's brand identity beyond purely the musical sphere, by designing and manufacturing a series of op-art and pop-art T-shirts for use in Generation X's photo-shoots and live performances, and James was attentive to its public image conveyed in the act's dress and styling. The band's co-manager Jonh Ingham introduced them to the graphic artist Barney Bubbles, who with them created the cover for the "Your Generation" single release, drawing inspiration from the 1920s abstract geometric work of Russian designer El Lissitzky, which introduced the Russian Constructivist school into English pop music design, which would be utilized by other bands into the 21st Century. Bubbles was also commissioned by the band to design its newspaper adverts and posters.

In September 1977, Generation X was one of the first punk units to appear on the BBC's mainstream pop music programme Top of the Pops, and began to acquire some mass media recognition as one of the punk-rock acts that had an accessibility of sound and image, with the potential to achieve commercial pop music success. Contrarily, the same analysis led to recurring adverse criticism of the band in the media of the alternative music scene from which it had emerged, with a number of reviewers dismissing the act as artistically and intellectually vapid, and suggesting that it was using the guise of being a part of the punk movement cynically as a stepping-stone in pursuance of more prosaic pop music fame and fortune. Because punk-rock developed an increasingly radical overtone, driven partly by the politicized content of the songs of The Clash, Generation X also faced accusations of being middle-class interlopers upon what was increasingly espoused as a working-class sub-culture movement; evidence for this being a story in circulation within the scene originating from the music journalist Tony Parsons of the New Musical Express that when Idol and James had turned up in The Ship pub in Wardour Street for an interview with him, on being asked what they wanted to drink, had requested orange juices, and had openly criticized and rejected on an intellectual basis the hedonism of the "Sex, drugs and Rock 'n' Roll" lifestyle. The interview had been conducted shortly after the band's formation, and James and Idol (particularly the latter) had since moved some way from this stance as they moved through the social circles of London's pop music scene, but the initial impression from it lingered in the British punk rock movement.

Generation X stood out in the burgeoning milieu of punk-music bands for its combination of the raw raucous energy of punk-rock, with a more commercially melodic sound and visual image in the tradition of earlier British pop music styles of the 1960s, drawing influences from bands such as The Who, The Kinks, The Small Faces, and the Beatles. It also produced songs that lyrically focused on the concerns of being an adolescent in West London in the late 1970s and, apart from playing a few gigs in support of Rock Against Racism, eschewed the societal commentary, cultural nihilism and radical politics of the punk movement, for which it drew some criticism from its peers, including John Lydon, the frontman-lyricist of the preeminent Sex Pistols.

In late September/early October 1977, the band spent several days recording demo sessions, overseen by Phil Wainman, at Utopia Studios in Primrose Hill, North London, in preparation for its first album release.

In mid-November 1977, the band released the single "Wild Youth", written on the spur of the moment during a publicity photo-shoot with the photographer Ray Stevenson, in the streets of London's West End a few weeks earlier, the song being inspired by street graffiti. The single's cover-art comprised individual colourized rotoscoped band portraits, taken by the photographer Peter "Kodick" Gravelle. It was produced by Phil Wainman at Utopia Studios, with an experimental b-side track entitled "Wild Dub" attempting an early fusion, before the subsequent Two-tone movement, of the ska music of the West and South London Afro-Caribbean immigrant communities with Generation X's punk-pop sound, following on from The Clash's foray into the same area a few months earlier, with their cover of the song "Police and Thieves". On release, "Wild Youth" was the only commercial single issued by Generation X that failed to enter the UK singles chart.

Towards the end of 1977, Jonh Ingham resigned from Generation X's management as a preliminary to his going to live in the United States, and after having come into conflict with Tony James, leaving Stewart Joseph in sole charge.

In February 1978, the single "Ready Steady Go" (with a b-side track entitled "No No No") was released with cover art taken from the design of one of the band's self-produced T-shirts, but it failed to enter the top 40 of the UK singles chart. The band kept a hectic touring schedule throughout Great Britain through 1978, which included the event of a Hells Angel in the crowd at a gig in Derby in mid-March, climbing up on to the stage and punching Idol in the face hard enough to cause him to fly backwards "like a ping-pong ball", landing in the drum-kit – Idol getting back on to his feet, dusting himself down and resuming the band's performance as if nothing had happened. In the same month, the band's first long-player was released, entitled Generation X (1978), produced by Martin Rushent and engineered by Alan Winstanley at T.W. Studios in Fulham, with a cover portrait shot photographed by Gered Mankowitz. The collection went to No. 29 in the UK Albums Chart.

In April the New Musical Express featured Generation X in a two-page centre-spread interview with the band, to facilitate the first LP's retail sales, with a front-page full feature photo of Idol and James on the foreshore of the River Thames beneath the Embankment, taken by Pennie Smith. The article's illustration, atypically for band photography, displayed Idol with James separately from Andrews with Laff, and gave rise to talk within the punk scene that this was indicative of an inherent divide of some nature within the act, with it possessing an inner core which Andrews and Laff were not party to.

The band maintained a high work rate of live performances as the year developed, with Idol also going on a first promotional visit for the band to the United States in May 1978, followed by another international gig for the band in Paris in June, several live BBC radio performances, and being supported by a new West Sussex band named The Cure for several dates in November and December 1978. In October, Generation X went into Wessex Sound Studios in Islington, with Ian Hunter acting as record producer, to record their second album, entitled Valley of the Dolls, which saw the band moving to a style of mainstream rock music, with the incorporation of aspects of the early 1970s glam punk movement and progressive rock into its sound and look, along with the mid-1970s song-writing techniques of Bruce Springsteen.

=== 1979: Break-up ===
In January 1979, the band with its manager Stewart Joseph was called into the offices of Chrysalis Records, where they were told that the label was unhappy that the money that it had invested into the act since mid-1977 was not being reflected in its chart success, and that if its next single, entitled "King Rocker", was not a hit its contract would be dropped. After the meeting, Joseph announced a cut in the band's members' weekly wages as an inducement to harder work. On release in the same month "King Rocker" (1979), with a b-side cover of John Lennon's "Gimme Some Truth", taken from a BBC live radio performance in 1977, became the band's commercial career high point, going to No. 11 in the UK singles chart, assisted by being issued in the format of a variety of differently coloured discs with distinctive band portrait cover art, which required multiple purchases of the single to acquire the complete set, designed by Barney Bubbles, who had worked on the band's graphic art previously in 1977.

However, after a couple of propitious opening years, the band's third year saw a deterioration in its chart success from the high of the "King Rocker" single, with the Valley of the Dolls (1979) album, also released in January, performing disappointingly in the UK Albums Chart, reaching only No. 51. The new LP also received a critical mauling in the music press, with reviewers slating it as overblown and artistically hollow, which had the effect of undermining Idol's confidence in Tony James' judgement, given that the record had been personally dominated by James' ideas throughout its production. The situation was not improved by Generation X being driven off stage by an onslaught of missiles from a mob of U.K. Subs fans, during a triple-bill concert at the Lyceum Ballroom in London in February 1979, as a part of an ongoing violent tendency from a proto-street punk element that dogged the band's live appearances. As the year progressed amidst a continuing heavy touring and increasing television performance schedule, induced by the commercial failure of the Valley of the Dolls, and a lessening impact on the UK singles chart of its releases, with the title song from the LP peaking at No. 23 in March 1979 and the song "Friday's Angels" dying at No. 62 in June, consequential differences began to surface within the band in terms of personality antagonisms, centered upon Andrews and Idol. Andrews was in antipathy with Idol's changing character caused by Idol's increasingly severe narcotic use, and his sensing of a soloist career intent within Idol (who was beginning to create a performance-persona based on elements from the solo acts of Gary Glitter, Elvis Presley and Billy Fury in their prime), which was in combination destabilizing the band's internal relationships. Rifts were also opening as to Generation X's future musical direction post Valley of the Dolls sales failure. Andrews, who had been impressed by the recent work of the critically acclaimed Joy Division, favoured a move into the new indie rock sound, and wanted more of an involvement in the band's song composition, whilst Idol and James were drawn to a more mainstream and apparently commercial dance-punk one, were flirting with the idea of incorporating elements of shock rock into the band's act, and refused to admit his material into their song-writing partnership. These internal disagreements, complicated by the loss – in legal acrimony – of the band's manager Stewart Joseph, came to a head towards the end of 1979, after the band had returned from its first international tour in Japan. During uncompleted production sessions at Olympic Studios in Barnes for what was to have been Generation X's third album (released retrospectively 20 years later under the title K.M.D. – Sweet Revenge), and a fragmentary brief tour of small venues ending in the West Country, Andrews quit the band just before Christmas. At Idol's instigation, Mark Laff was also asked to leave the band a few weeks later after a disagreement with Idol and James about its song-writing credits, with Laff objecting to the drumming tracks that he was creating, not being recognized in its legal and financial arrangements regarding rights. Idol in return was of the view that Laff's playing style, heavily influenced by that of Keith Moon's, was unsuited to the new sound that Idol wished the act to pursue, and had developed doubts about Laff's professional capabilities since the recording of the Valley of the Dolls, when Laff was judged to be technically inadequate by its producer Ian Hunter, to the degree that a session drummer had to be hired by the band for the work in the studio. Laff and the session drummer, Clive Bunker, eventually played together on the tracks, achieving a distinctive double-drum sound. Laff departed to join Andrews in a new band entitled Empire, which found little commercial success; Andrews would return to the British chart in the late 1980s with the pop rock/rockabilly band Westworld. Generation X's last live performance was at Gloucester's Jamaican Club on 30 November 1979.

=== 1980–1981: New line-up ===
With Andrews and Laff gone (with James putting out a line to the music press's questions as to why Generation X had split that he and Idol had fired them, because they "had a terrible tendency to sound like Deep Purple"), Idol and James recruited Terry Chimes as a replacement drummer. James also found a manager for the new formation in the form of Bill Aucoin, however after assessing the act's potential, Aucoin was surreptitiously more interested in the commercial possibilities of Idol as a solo artist in the American marketplace than the band, and began moving behind the scenes to this end.

This new line-up re-titled itself as Gen X, styling itself as a new romantic band with a Neo-Victorian/Victorian Gothic look, influenced by Idol's interest in the writings of Samuel Taylor Coleridge.

In March 1980, Gen X went into Eel Pie Studios in Soho with the lead guitarist Steve New to record a demo session. Idol and James wanted New to be Gen X's guitarist, but, after recording and rehearsing with him through the early months of 1980, they abandoned the idea over concerns about his professional reliability due to a narcotic habit.

In mid-1980, Gen X went into AIR Studios in Oxford Street to re-record some of the Sweet Revenge material and several new songs for a new long-player. Chrysalis Records, now subject to the influence of Aucoin, had shown reluctance to fund it after the commercial failure of Valley of the Dolls in the previous year, and the debacle at the Olympic Studios a few months before, and to secure the new financing, Idol had to recourse to entering into discussions with the label of the option of a potential solo career signed to it beyond the band's existence. Also involved in the recording sessions, along with Steve New, was a selection of some of the best lead guitarists in London's post-punk scene that were looking for new units to team up with, viz., John McGeoch, Steve Jones, and Danny Kustow, who acted as session musicians in what was essentially a tryout for the new band's guitar slot. In January 1981, a long-player produced by Keith Forsey was released titled Kiss Me Deadly (1981).

However, the production of the new record had been problematic. Tony James later described narcotic use by other members of the line-up, including Idol, during the recording sessions as hampering it, and his personal working relationship with Idol was becoming distanced by James' unease at Idol's intensifying attraction to opiates (James would later ascribe the cause of the end of the band and his professional partnership with Idol to: "really, drugs destroyed us"). This distancing was exacerbated by Idol's increasing self-sufficiency in song-writing, a wearying of James's company due to what Idol perceived as an uptight and intense demeanor that had developed in James's personality, and an increasing allure to Idol of the prospects of a solo career for himself, which had been waxing in his mind since the failure of the Valley of the Dolls in 1979. Also, during the recording of the Kiss Me Deadly, James had got on badly with its producer Keith Forsey, with whom Idol had established a professional rapport and was eager to work with again.

The record itself, despite the innovation of its sound as a part of the new wave movement in pop music, and its display of Idol and James' maturing talent as songwriters, failed to chart on release, regardless of a brief low-key tour in November 1980 to January 1981 (with James Stevenson playing guitar) to promote it. A lacklustre pre-release in October 1980 of the song "Dancing with Myself", backed by a B-side of a Rocksteadyesque dub song entitled "Ugly Rash", with a stark cover art portrait of Idol photographed by Iain McKell utilizing a child model in a disturbing way, had also failed to launch the new act, reaching only No. 62 in the UK singles chart. A hotchpotch EP, entitled Gen X – 4, containing Generation X and Gen X material was also released in January to little effect. Critical reviews of the new LP in the music press were also generally indifferent, or hostile, with Smash Hits magazine giving it 2 out of 10. In consequence, after receiving notification from Aucoin that Idol was now willing to abandon the band, Chrysalis Records dropped the contract, writing off the quarter of a million pounds that it had invested into the act's development over four years, and Gen X broke up in February 1981. Their last public performances were an appearance on BBC Television's Oxford Road Show (with Idol wearing cross-dressing stage clothes of a male neo-Gothic high collared coat combined with female knickers and black-tights), and a gig recorded live by BBC Radio at the Paris Theatre in London on 7 January 1981.

Idol and James parted company in February 1981 (with an unnamed party briefing the music press that the premature end of Gen X had been brought about due to a "chemical imbalance"), after Gen X's ex-manager Bill Aucoin advised Idol to relocate from London to New York City. James went on to form and perform with the rockabilly/cyberpunk act Sigue Sigue Sputnik, with which he returned to the British chart in the late 1980s, with a single and a long-player entering the Top 10. Idol left England with a solo artist contract from Chrysalis Records to start anew in the United States, taking Gen X's single "Dancing with Myself" as a calling card. During the 1980s he became one of the most commercially successful pop/rock stars that sprang from the 1970s punk rock movement.

== Reunions ==
On 20 September 1993, during the England leg of Idol's 'No Religion' tour, the late 1970s Generation X reformed for a one-off performance at the Astoria Theatre in London's West End.

On 30 October 2018, Billy Idol and Tony James along with Steve Jones and Paul Cook, formerly of the Sex Pistols, performed a free entry gig at The Roxy in Hollywood, Los Angeles, California, under the name Generation Sex, playing a combined set of the two former bands' material. Entrance tickets were allotted to applicants via a lottery.

== Members ==
Final Lineup

- Billy Idol – lead vocals (1976–1981, 1993), guitar (1980)
- Derwood Andrews – guitar, backing vocals (1976–1979, 1993)
- Tony James – bass, backing vocals (1976–1981, 1993)
- Mark Laff – drums, backing vocals (1977–1979, 1993)

Other members

- John Towe – drums (1976–1977)
- Terry Chimes – drums (1980–1981)
- James Stevenson – guitar (1980–1981)

== Discography ==
- Generation X (1978)
- Valley of the Dolls (1979)
- Kiss Me Deadly (1981)
- K.M.D. – Sweet Revenge (1998)

== See also ==
- D.O.A.: A Rite of Passage
- Bromley Contingent
- List of punk bands from the United Kingdom
- List of Peel Sessions
- List of 1970s punk rock musicians
- List of performers on Top of the Pops
- Music of the United Kingdom (1970s)

== Sources ==
- Ray Stevenson, Regeneration, Symbiosis (1986) – A history of Generation X in photographs and press interviews.
