= The Very Best of Billy Idol: Idolize Yourself =

Greatest hits album by Billy Idol
- Released: 24 June 2008
- Recorded: 1981–2008
- Genres: Post-punk; new wave; hard rock; punk rock
- Length: 77:36
- Label: Capitol
- Producers: Josh Abraham; Keith Forsey; Robin Hancock; Billy Idol; Ralph Sall; Steve Stevens

Billy Idol chronology
Happy Holidays (2006)	The Very Best of Billy Idol: Idolize Yourself (2008)	Kings & Queens of the Underground (2014)

Professional ratings
Review scores
Source	Rating
AllMusic	4/5 stars

The Very Best of Billy Idol: Idolize Yourself is a greatest hits album by the English rock singer Billy Idol, released on 24 June 2008 by Capitol Records. It features 16 of Idol's past singles, as well as two new tracks, "John Wayne" and "New Future Weapon". An additional new track, "Fractured", is available exclusively through download retailers. A deluxe CD/DVD set containing 13 music videos was also released. The compilation omitted all videos from the Cyberpunk era and all singles and videos from Devil's Playground. "John Wayne" was later re-recorded for Idol's ninth studio album Dream Into It.

== Track listing ==
The Very Best of Billy Idol: Idolize Yourself – CD
No.	Title	Writer(s)	Length
1.	"Dancing with Myself" (EP Version, by Generation X)	Billy Idol, Tony James	4:51
2.	"Hot in the City"	Idol	3:33
3.	"White Wedding" (Part 1)	Idol	4:13
4.	"Rebel Yell"	Idol, Steve Stevens	4:47
5.	"Eyes Without a Face"	Idol, Stevens	4:58
6.	"Flesh for Fantasy"	Idol, Stevens	4:38
7.	"Catch My Fall"	Idol	3:42
8.	"To Be a Lover"	William Bell, Booker T. Jones	3:53
9.	"Don't Need a Gun" (Single Edit)	Idol	5:24
10.	"Sweet Sixteen"	Idol	4:15
11.	"Mony Mony"	Tommy James, Bo Gentry, Richie Cordell, Bobby Bloom	5:00
12.	"Cradle of Love"	Idol, David Werner	4:39
13.	"L.A. Woman" (Single Edit)	Jim Morrison, Robby Krieger, Ray Manzarek, John Densmore	4:04
14.	"Shock to the System"	Idol, Mark Younger-Smith	3:37
15.	"Speed" (Album Version)	Idol, Stevens	4:17
16.	"World Comin' Down"	Idol, Brian Tichy	3:34
17.	"John Wayne"	Idol, Tichy, Derek Sherinian	4:15
18.	"New Future Weapon"	Idol, Tichy	3:56

The Very Best of Billy Idol: Idolize Yourself – Digital download (bonus track)
No.	Title	Writer(s)	Length
19.	"Fractured"	Idol, Tichy	4:27

The Very Best of Billy Idol: Idolize Yourself – Deluxe edition (bonus DVD)
No.	Title	Director	Length
1.	"Dancing with Myself"	Tobe Hooper	3:24
2.	"Hot in the City" (1987 version)	Larry Jordan	3:56
3.	"White Wedding" (MTV-censored version)	David Mallet	3:29
4.	"Rebel Yell"	Jeff Stein	4:52
5.	"Eyes Without a Face"	Mallet	4:56
6.	"Flesh for Fantasy"	Howard Deutch*	4:22
7.	"Catch My Fall"	Mallet	3:43
8.	"To Be a Lover"	Mallet	3:50
9.	"Don't Need a Gun"	Julien Temple	4:59
10.	"Sweet Sixteen"	Peter Sinclair	4:20
11.	"Mony Mony – Live"	Jordan	4:16
12.	"Cradle of Love" (Extended Billy Idol Only Version)	David Fincher	5:22
13.	"L.A. Woman"	Fincher	4:03

* CD/DVD booklet miscredits David Mallet as director of the video

== Personnel ==
Produced by Keith Forsey except:

- "Shock to the System" (Robin Hancock)
- "Speed" (Ralph Sall, Billy Idol and Steve Stevens)
- "John Wayne" and "New Future Weapon" (Josh Abraham)

== Charts ==
Chart performance for The Very Best of Billy Idol: Idolize Yourself
Chart (2008)	Peak position
German Albums (Offizielle Top 100)	38
Hungarian Albums (MAHASZ)	29
New Zealand Albums (RMNZ)	39
Scottish Albums (Official Charts)	48
Swiss Albums (Schweizer Hitparade)	72
UK Albums (Official Charts)	37
US Billboard 200	73

== Certifications ==
Certifications for The Very Best of Billy Idol: Idolize Yourself
Region	Certification	Certified units/sales
New Zealand (RMNZ)	Platinum	15,000^{‡}
^{‡} Sales+streaming figures based on certification alone.
