= Sweet Sixteen (song) =

Single by Billy Idol

from the album Whiplash Smile
- B-side: "Beyond Belief"
- Released: April 1987 (US); 1 June 1987 (UK)
- Genre: New wave, soft rock
- Length: 4:14
- Label: Chrysalis
- Songwriter: Billy Idol
- Producer: Keith Forsey

Billy Idol singles chronology
"Don't Need a Gun" (1987)	"Sweet Sixteen" (1987)	"Soul Standing By" (1987)

Music video
- "Sweet Sixteen" on YouTube

"Sweet Sixteen" is a song by the English rock singer Billy Idol, released in 1987 as the third single from his third studio album, Whiplash Smile (1986). The song written by Idol and produced by Keith Forsey. It peaked at No. 20 in the US and No. 17 in the UK. It was also a hit across Europe and beyond.

== Background ==
"Sweet Sixteen" was inspired by the true story of Edward Leedskalnin, a Latvian emigrant who single-handedly built the Coral Castle in Florida. In Latvia, he was set to marry Agnes Skuvst, but she broke the engagement and Leedskalnin decided to immigrate to America. He built the Coral Castle there in dedication to Skuvst, who he often referred to as his "Sweet Sixteen". Idol wrote the song after watching "The Castle of Secrets", an episode of Leonard Nimoy's program In Search of... which was based on Coral Castle. The song was written during the making of Idol's 1983 album Rebel Yell.

In his 2014 autobiography, Idol described the song as a "heartfelt lament". He added that while the castle was Leedskalnin's "coral memorial" to his former love, "Sweet Sixteen" was Idol's to his then-girlfriend Perri Lister.

== Music video ==
Two music videos were filmed to promote the single. The black-and-white version, directed by Peter Sinclair, featured Idol performing the song in an empty room. An alternative video, filmed in colour, featured scenes shot at Coral Castle.

== Release ==
The single was released on 7", 12" and cassette by Chrysalis. The B-Side was the Whiplash Smile album track "Beyond Belief. For the 12" single, another track from the album, "One Night, One Chance" was also included. The UK edition of the 12" single, which was also released in some other European countries, included an extended version of "Rebel Yell" instead.

== Critical reception ==
In a contemporary review of Whiplash Smile, Rolling Stone described the song as having an "acoustic shuffle", which "recalled the texture" of Idol's 1984 hit "Eyes Without a Face". Billboard noted in their review of the album: "...quick spins of "World's Forgotten Boy," "Sweet Sixteen," and "Don't Need a Gun" provide positive indication that Idol is rocking on the right track." In a retrospective AllMusic review of the album, Johnny Loftus commented on the song's "weird, Marty Robbins-meets-Del Shannon-in-space vibe." Loftus also selected the song as one of the album's highlights by labelling it an AMG Pick Track. On the 30th anniversary of the album, Ultimate Classic Rock described the song as a "relatively stripped-back acoustic love song".

== Formats and track listing ==
7" single

1. "Sweet Sixteen" – 4:14
2. "Beyond Belief" – 4:00

7" single (Costa Rican release)

1. "Sweet Sixteen" – 4:14
2. "Man For All Seasons" – 4:38

7" single (US promo release)

1. "Sweet Sixteen" – 4:14
2. "Sweet Sixteen" – 4:14

7" single (Australian limited edition double-pack release)

1. "Sweet Sixteen" – 4:14
2. "Beyond Belief" – 4:00
3. "Mony Mony (Extended Version)" – 5:01
4. "White Wedding (Extended Version)" – 8:20

12" single (UK and European release)

1. "Sweet Sixteen" – 4:14
2. "Beyond Belief" – 4:00
3. "Rebel Yell (Extended Version)" – 4:45

12" single (European release)

1. "Sweet Sixteen" – 4:14
2. "Beyond Belief" – 4:00
3. "One Night, One Chance" – 3:52

12" single (US promo release)

1. "Sweet Sixteen" – 4:14
2. "Sweet Sixteen" – 4:14

Cassette single (UK release)

1. "Sweet Sixteen" – 4:14
2. "Beyond Belief" – 4:00

Cassette single (Canadian limited edition release)

1. "Sweet Sixteen" – 4:14
2. "White Wedding" – 4:12

Cassette single (1990 US release)

1. "Sweet Sixteen" – 4:14
2. "To Be a Lover" – 3:51

== Personnel ==
Production

- Keith Forsey – production
- Gary Langan – mixing

Other (sleeve)

- Pat Gorman – design
- Dick Zimmerman – photography

== Charts ==
=== Weekly charts ===
Weekly chart performance for "Sweet Sixteen"
Chart (1987)	Peak position
Australia (Kent Music Report)	9
Austria (Ö3 Austria Top 40)	5
Belgium (Ultratop 50 Flanders)	9
Canada Top Singles (RPM)	18
Finland (Suomen virallinen lista)	16
Ireland (IRMA)	9
Italy Airplay (Music & Media)	3
Netherlands (Dutch Top 40)	7
Netherlands (Single Top 100)	11
New Zealand (Recorded Music NZ)	3
South Africa (RISA)	30
Switzerland (Schweizer Hitparade)	12
UK Singles (Official Charts)	17
US Billboard Hot 100	20
US Mainstream Rock (Billboard)	26
West Germany (GfK)	2

=== Year-end charts ===
1987 year-end chart performance for "Sweet Sixteen"
Chart (1987)	Position
Australia (Australian Music Report)	73
Belgium (Ultratop)	97
European Hot 100 Singles (Music & Media)	63
Netherlands (Dutch Top 40)	75
Netherlands (Single Top 100)	87
New Zealand (RIANZ)	21
West Germany (Media Control)	10
