= Ruth B. Bottigheimer =

American literary scholar

Ruth B. Bottigheimer is a literary scholar, folklorist, and author. Currently Research Professor in the Department of English at Stony Brook University, State University of New York she specializes in European fairy tales and British children’s literature. She has also researched and published on the history of illustration, the religious socialization of children through edited Bible narratives, and stories told by Hannā Diyāb to Antoine Galland and included in his French edition of the Arabian Nights. She “has been hailed as one of America’s foremost Grimm scholars”.

== Education ==
Bottigheimer earned her doctorate in German Literature and Language in 1981 through Stony Brook University, State University of New York. She earned a B.A. (Honors) in German Literature and Medieval History and an M.A. in German Literature at the University of California, Berkeley. She also attended Wellesley College, LMU Munich, and the University College London.

== Career ==
In addition to her position at Stony Brook University, Bottigheimer has also taught at Hollins University, the University of Innsbruck, the University of Vienna, Göttingen University, and Princeton University. She is a member of numerous professional organizations including the International Society for Folk Narrative Research, Bruder Grimm Gesellschaft, and the Children’s Literature Association.

The Stony Brook University website states that “[Bottigheimer’s] work crosses disciplinary boundaries, contextualizing genres in their socio-historical cultures of origin, assessing them in terms of publishing history parameters, and utilizing linguistics in discourse analysis”.

A Fulbright Scholar, Bottigheimer is a life fellow of Clare Hall, Cambridge and was also a visiting fellow at Magdalen College, Oxford. In 2019, Bottigheimer was awarded the Thuringian Fairy Tale and Legend Prize.

Bottigheimer’s languages of research include English, German, French, and occasionally Italian and Spanish.

Bottigheimer’s conclusions about the literary history of fairy tales, published in her 2009 book Fairy Tales: A New History, have created controversy among folklore scholars. At both the 2005 congress of the International Society for Folk Narrative Research in Estonia and the 2006 meeting of the American Folklore Society in Milwaukee, Bottigheimer’s claims—particularly the claim that the fairy tale “template” was originally conceived of by the 16th-century Italian writer Giovan Francesco Straparola—were repeatedly and “uproar[iously]” questioned by “unpersuaded” folklorists. Folklorists Dan Ben-Amos, Francisco Vaz da Silva, and Jan M. Ziolkowski each produced papers responding to Bottigheimer’s claims that appeared in the Journal of American Folklore in 2010. A response from Bottigheimer was published in the same issue.

== Publications ==
=== Books ===
- Magic Tales and Fairy Tale Magic from Ancient Egypt to the Italian Renaissance. (Palgrave Macmillan, 2014). Translated into German as Zaubererzählungen, Zaubermärchen, und Märchenmagie (Waxmann, 2024).
- Fairy Tales: A New History (Excelsior Editions: State University of New York, 2009). Translated into Arabic as Hikayat Al-Houriyat Al-Ra’iat: Tarikhon Jadid ([Egyptian] National Centre for Translation, 2015)
- Gender and Story in South India, Ed. with Lalita Handoo and Leela Prasad (State University of New York Press, 2007)
- Fairy Godfather: Straparola, Venice, and the Fairy Tale Tradition (University of Pennsylvania Press, 2002)
- The Bible for Children: From the Age of Gutenberg to the Present (Yale University Press, 1996) Translated into German as Eva biß mit Frevel an: Rezeptionskritisches Arbeiten mit Kinderbibeln in Schule und Gemeinde (Vandenhoeck & Ruprecht, 2003).
- Grimm’s Bad Girls and Bold Boys: The Moral and Social Vision of the Tales (Yale University Press, 1987) Translated into Japanese (Kinokuniya, 1990)and into German as 'Schuld und Chance: Die Wertewelt der Grimmschen Märchen (Jonas Verlag, 2019).
- "Fairy Tales Framed. Early Forewords, Afterwords, and Critical Words" Ed. (State University of New York, 2012)
- Fairy Tales, Printed Texts, and Oral Tellings: The Other History [=Marvels & Tales 21.1 (2007)]
- Gender and Story in South India, ed. with Leela Prasad. Albany NY: SUNY Press, 2006.

(reworking and expansion of Folklore and Folklore and Gender, see below)

- Folklore and Gender, Ed. with Lalita Handoo (Zooni Publications, 1999)
- Fairy Tales and Society: Illusion, Allusion and Paradigm, Ed. (University of Pennsylvania Press, 1987)

=== Articles ===
Bottigheimer has written numerous articles including:

- “As diferenças entre a mídia manuscrita e a impressa: formas dos (proto-)contos de fadas Liombruno de Cirino d’Ancona e Lionbruno de Vindalino da Spira, dos anos de 1470” (Manuscript and Print Media Differences: Shapers of the 1470s (Proto) Fairy Tales Cirino d’Ancona’s Liombruno and Vindalino da Spira’s Lionbruno). LiterArtes 1.12 (2020) 260–274.
- “Das Alter in Grimms Kinder- und Hausmärchen.” Alter im Märchen. Eds. Harm-Peer Zimmermann and Simone Stiefbold. Volkach: Märchenstiftung Walter Kahn, 2020. 29–40. (=Schriftenreihe RINGVORLESUNGEN der Märchenstiftung Walter Kahn 18 UNI Zürich.)
- “Hannâ Diyâb, Antoine Galland, and Hannâ Diyâb’s Tales: I. On-the-Spot Recordings, Later Summaries, and One Translation; II. Western Sources in Eastern Texts.” In Mémoires de l’Association pour la Promotion de l’Histoire et de l’Archéologie Orientales. Liège: Peeters, 2020. 51–72.
- "Antikes Numinoses und moderner Zauber: Das Schaudern, das Glück auf Erden und Jenseitseigenschaften als abgrenzenden Kennzeichen des Numinosen." In: Karthrin Pöge-Alder und Harm-Peer Zimmermann (Eds.), Numinoses Erzählen: Das Andere - Das Jenseitige - Das Zauberische. Beiträge zu Volkskunde in Sachsen-Anhalt 5 (2019): 83–93.
- "Reading for Fun in Eighteenth-Century Aleppo. The Hanna Dyâb Tales of Galland’s Mille et Une Nuits." Book History 22 (2019): 133–160.
- "'Eigentliche Märchen und biblische Geschichten: Ein Zusammenhang?" Märchenspiegel. 30.2 (2019): 44–49.
- "Straparola’s Piacevoli Notti and Fairy-Tale Poetics." Kreuz- und Querzüge: Beiträge zu einer literarischen Anthropologie. Festschrift for Alfred Messerli. Eds Harm-Peer Zimmermann, Peter O. Büttner, and Bernhard Tschofen. Hannover: Wehrhahn, 2019. 289–304.
- "Vliegende tapijten in Duizend-en-een-nacht: Disney, Dyâb ... en d'Aulnoy?" Volkskunde 2017 3:255-272.
  - Translated into English as Flying Carpets in the Arabian Nights: Disney, Dyâb ... and d'Aulnoy?" Gramarye 13 (2018): 18-34.
- "Hanna Dyâb's Witch and the Great Witch Shift." In Cultures of Witchcraft in Europe from the Middle Ages to the Present, eds. Jonathan Barry, Owen Davies, and Cornelie Usborne. Basingstoke: Palgrave Macmillan Springer, 2017. 53–77. (=Festschrift for Willem de Blécourt).
- "Gurimu Kyodai, Gehte, Casan do Pahsival: Arabian Naito to Ibunka Riron," (The Grimms, Goethe, and Caussin de Perceval: The Arabian Nights and Theories of Cultural Difference), trans. Ritsuko Inage and Yoshiko Noguchi. 161–176 in Gurimu Kenkyu no atarashii Chihei—Densho, Gender, Shakai (A New Horizon in Grimm Research: Tradition, Gender, and Society. =Festschrift for Yoshiko Noguchi), ed. Hisako Ohno. Osaka: Bensei-shuppan, 2017.
- “Cinderella: The People’s Princess.” 27–51 in Cinderella, ed. Gillian Lathey et al. Detroit: Wayne State University Press, 2016.
- “Stimmen aus der Vergangenheit.” 1: 133–141 in Märchen, Mythen und Moderne. 200 Jahre Kinder- und Hausmärchen der Brüder Grimm. Kongressband, 2 vols. eds. Claudia Brinker-von der Heyde, Holger Ehrhardt, Hans-Heino Ewers, Annekatrin Inder. Frankfurt a. M. u.a.: Peter Lang Verlag, 2015.
- “Storytelling in Amerika und die frühesten Märchen als städisches Phänomen.” 34–42 in Erzählen im Prozess des gesellschaftlichen und medialen Wandels. Märchen, Mythen, klassische und modern Kinderliteratur: Schneider Verlag Hohengehren, 2015 (=Schriftenreihre der DeutschenAkademie für Kinder- und Jugendliteratur 43).
- “The Case of ‘The Ebony Horse. Part II Hanna Diyab’s Creation of a Third Tradition.’” Gramarye 6 (2014): 6-16.
- “The Case of ‘The Ebony Horse. Part I’” With Claudia Ott. Gramarye 5 (2014): 8-20.
- “East Meets West in Thousand and One Nights.” Marvels & Tales 28.2 (2014): 302–324.
- “A Career That Wasn’t.” In Tema y variaciones de Literatura número 41 (Literatura infantil y juvenil: reflexiones, análisis y testimonios) [Theme and Variations of Literature Number 41 (Children's Literature: Reflections, Analysis and Testimonies)]. ed. Alejandra Sánchez Valencia.2013: 251–268.
- “Skeptics and Enthusiasts: Nineteenth-Century Prefaces to the Grimms’ Tales in English Translation.” In Grimms' Tales around the Globe: The Dynamics of Their International Reception, eds. Vanessa Joosen and Gillian Lathey. Detroit: Wayne State University, 2014. 199-218.
- “Children’s Bibles: An Overview and a History of their Scholarship,” in Retelling the Bible: Literary Historical, and Social Contexts, eds. Lucie Dolžalová and Tamás Visi. Frankfurt: Peter Lang, 2011. 359–365.
- “Fairy Tale Illustrations and Real World Gender: Function, Conceptualization, and Publication.” RELIEF 2010 (electronic publication).
- “Upward and Outward: Fairy Tales and Popular, Print, and Proletarian Culture, 1550-1850.” Elore (ISSN 1456-3010) 17.2 (2010): 104–120. Joensuu (Finland): The Finnish Folklore Society .
- “Les contes médievaux et les contes de fées moderns” in Féeries 7 (2010): 21–43.
- “Fairy Godfather, Fairy-Tale History, and Fairy-Tale Scholarship: A Response to Dan Ben-Amos, Jan Ziolkowski, and Francisco Vaz da Silva” in Fairy-Tale Traditions between Orality and Literacy, ed. Dan Ben-Amos [= Journal of American Folklore 123.490 (Fall 2010):] 447–496.
- “A New History for Fairy Tales.” 53–70 in The Conte: Oral and Written Dynamics, eds. Maeve M. McCusker and Janice Carruthers. London: Lang, 2010.
- “Murdering mothers in Bible stories and fairy tales.” In Representations of Women Victims and Perpetrators in German Culture 1500–2000. Rochester NY: Camden House, 2008. 28–42.
- "Children's Bibles: Sacralized and Problematic," 97–110 in Expectations and Experiences: Children, Childhood, and Children’s Literature, eds. Valerie Coughlan and Clare Bradford. Lichfield: Pied Piper Press, 2007.
- “Semiliterate and Semi-Oral Processes” with Rudolf Schenda in Marvels & Tales 21 (1) (2007)
- “France’s First Fairy Tales: The Restoration and Rise Narratives of Les facetieuses nuictz du Seigneur Francois Straparole” in Marvels & Tales 19 (1) (2005)
- “Misperceived Perceptions: Perrault’s Fairy Tales and English Children’s Literature” in Children’s Literature 30 (2002)
- "Les Bibles pour enfants et leurs lecteurs aux XVIe et XVIIe siècles en France et en Allemagne" in La Bible Imprimée dans l'Europe moderne (Bibliothèque Nationale de France, 1999)
- "Männlich - Weiblich: Sexualität und Geschlechterrollen” in Männlch - Weiblich: Zur Bedeutung der Kategorie Geschlecht in der Kultur (Waxmann Verlag, 1999)
- "Illustration and Imagination" in Fellowship Program Researchers' Report, International Institute for Children's Literature Osaka 1999: 71–106 (English), 42–70 (Japanese).
- "Cultural History and the Meanings of Children's Literature" in Signal 87 (September 1998)
- "'An Important System of its Own': Defining Children's Literature" in Princeton University Library Chronicle 69.2 (1998)
- "Children's Bibles 1690–1750 and the Emergence of Fictions for Children" in Compar(a)ison 2 (1995)
- "Children's Bibles as a Form of Folk Narrative" (182–190) in Folk Narrative and Cultural Identity. 9th Congress of the International Society for Folk Narrative Research. Budapest 1989 Ed. Vilmos Voigt (Budapest 1995)
- "The Child-Reader of Children's Bibles 1656–1753" (44–56) in Infant Tongues: The Voice of the Child in Literature Ed. Elizabeth Goodenough, Mark Heberle, and Naomi Sokoloff (Wayne State University Press, 1994)
- "The Bible for Children: The Emergence and Development of the Genre 1550–1990" (347–62) in The Church and Childhood: Studies in Church History 31 Ed. Diana Woods and Janet Nelson (Blackwell, 1994)
- "Fairy Tales and Children's Literature: A Feminist Perspective" (101–108) in Options for the Teaching of Children's Literature (Modern Language Association, 1992)
- "Ludwig Bechstein's Fairy Tales: Nineteenth Century Bestsellers and Bürgerlichkeit" in Internationales Archiv für Sozialgeschichte der deutschen Literatur 15.2 (1990)
- "One Hundred and Fifty Years of German at Princeton: A Descriptive Account" in Teaching German in America: Prolegomena to a History Ed. David Benseler, Walter F. W. Lohnes, & Valters Nollendorfs (University of Wisconsin Press, 1988)
- "Studies in Silence: Speech Patterns in Grimm's Fairy Tales" in Fairy Tales and Society (University of Pennsylvania Press, 1986)
- "Iconographic Continuity: A Study of the Illustration History of 'The Goosegirl' (KHM 89)" in Children's Literature 13 (1985)
- "The Transformed Queen: A Search for the Origins of Negative Female Archetypes in the Grimms' Fairy Tales" in Amsterdamer Beiträge 10 (1980)

In addition to the above works, Bottigheimer has also written numerous reviews, encyclopedia articles, and published several translations.
