= Rasma =

Female given name

- Gender: Female
- Name day: 20 June

Origin
- Region of origin: Latvia

Rasma is a Latvian given name and may refer to:

- Rasma Garne (born 1941), Latvian actress
- Rasma Kārkliņa (born 1946), Latvian political scientist
