= Eyes Without a Face =

Eyes Without a Face can refer to:

- Eyes Without a Face (film), (French: Les yeux sans visage), a 1960 French horror film
- "Eyes Without a Face" (song), a 1984 Billy Idol song
- "Eyes Without a Face" (Industry), a 2026 television episode
