= Yoshi Kajiro =

- 上代 淑
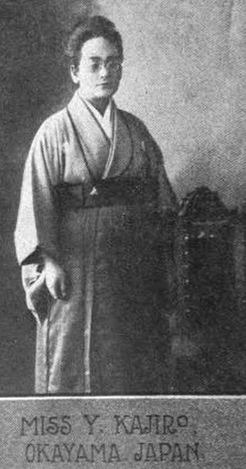
- Yoshi Kajiro, from a 1907 publication.
- Pronunciation: かじろ よし
- Born: 1871; Matsuyama, Ehime Prefecture
- Died: 1959 (aged 87–88)
- Education: Mount Holyoke College

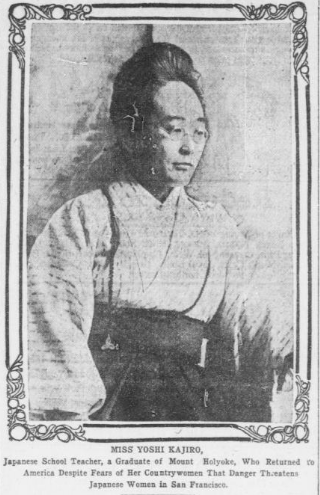
Yoshi Kajiro, from a 1907 newspaper article.

Yoshi Kajiro (1871–1959) was a Japanese educator, the longtime principal of the Sanyō Girls' High School in Okayama.

== Early life ==
Yoshi Kajiro was born in Matsuyama, in Ehime Prefecture, the daughter of Kajiro Tomoyoshi (1852–1921), a Christian convert who later established a Japanese church in the Kakaako district of Honolulu. She was educated at Baika Girls' School, which was founded by Japanese Christians.

== At Mount Holyoke College ==
Sponsored by American missionaries, she attended Mount Holyoke College in the United States, to train as a teacher. She was the third of four women to attend Mount Holyoke from Japan in the 1890s. She was required by the mission board to wear western clothing while attending Mount Holyoke as a student, though she wore a traditional kimono for demonstrations. Her opinion on the First Sino-Japanese War was reported by a New York newspaper in 1894, while Kajiro was a student on summer vacation in Honeoye, New York.

== Career ==
After graduating from Mount Holyoke in 1897, she returned to Japan and her work as "lady principal" of the Sanyō Girls' High School in Okayama. "The glory of Miss Kajiro's work is that it is not western work supported from Boston; but it is one of those glorious developments of large Christian work outside of missionary control, bearing the lamp of life where no missionary could go, and helping make a Christian atmosphere for the homes of hundreds of girls, and for the city in which she is a great moral power," reported one American publication in 1914.

In 1906, Kajiro's school was described as having 270 students, and by 1920 more than 300 girls studied under her leadership. In 1907 she made a ten-month sabbatical visit to the United States and Europe to study, and to publicize her work. She served as the school's head for 28 years.
