= Les Yeux sans visage =

Les Yeux sans visage may refer to:

- Les Yeux sans visage, a 1960 French film also known as Eyes Without a Face
- "Les Yeux Sans Visage", a 1996 Combustible Edison song
- "Eyes Without a Face (song)", a 1983 Billy Idol song
