= Association for the Advancement of Baltic Studies =

The Association for the Advancement of Baltic Studies (abbreviated as AABS) is an organization that aims to promote research and education in Baltic studies. The headquarters of AABS are located at the University of Washington, formerly these were located at University of Maryland.

AABS was established on 1 December 1968. In 1991, the AABS applied for a membership in the American Council of Learned Societies and was accepted on April 30 of the next year.

The official journal of AABS is Journal of Baltic Studies.

== Presidents ==
- 1968–1970 Gundar King (Gundars Ķeniņš-Kings)
- 1970–1971 V. Stanley Vardys
- 1972 Jaan Puhvel
- 1973 Edgar Anderson
- 1974 Rimvydas Šilbajoris
- 1975–1976 Ilse Lehiste
- 1977–1978 Valters Nollendorfs
- 1979-1980 Ivar Ivask
- 1981-1982 Marija Gimbutas
- 1982-1984 William R. Schmalstieg
- 1984-1986 Vaira Vīķe-Freiberga
- 1986-1988 Rein Taagepera
- 1988–1990 Andrejs Plakans
- 1990–1992 Tomas Venclova
- 1992–1994 Toivo Ülo Raun
- 1994–1996 Rasma Karklins (Rasma Kārkliņa)
- 1996–1998 Violeta Kelertas
- 1998–2000 Thomas Palm
- 2000–2002 Juris Dreifelds
- 2002-2004 Saulius Sužiedėlis
- 2004-2006 Thomas Salumets
- 2006–2008 Inta Gale Carpenter
- 2008–2010 Guntis Šmidchens
- 2010–2012 Vėjas Liulevičius
- 2012–2014 Ain Haas
- 2014–2016 Mara Lazda
- 2016–2018 Giedrius Subačius
- 2018–2020 Andres Kasekamp
- 2020–2022 Daunis Auers
- 2022–2024 Dovile Budryte
- 2024–2026 Jörg Hackmann
