= Whiplash Smile =

Studio album by Billy Idol
- Released: 20 October 1986
- Recorded: 1985–1986
- Studios: The Hit Factory (New York City) Right Track Studios; Unique Recording Studios (New York City, New York)
- Genres: New wave; hard rock
- Length: 45:29
- Label: Chrysalis
- Producer: Keith Forsey

Billy Idol chronology
Vital Idol (1985)	Whiplash Smile (1986)	Idol Songs: 11 of the Best (1988)

Singles from Whiplash Smile
- 1. "To Be a Lover" Released: 22 September 1986; 2. "Don't Need a Gun" Released: January 1987; 3. "Sweet Sixteen" Released: April 1987; 4. "Soul Standing By" Released: August 1987 (AU & NZ only)

Professional ratings
Review scores
Source	Rating
AllMusic	3.5/5 stars
Robert Christgau	C+
Record Mirror	3/5 stars
The Rolling Stone Album Guide	3/5 stars
Sounds	4/5 stars

Whiplash Smile is the third studio album by the English rock singer Billy Idol, released on 20 October 1986 by Chrysalis Records. After the success of his previous album, Rebel Yell (1983), Idol continued his collaboration with producer Keith Forsey and guitarist Steve Stevens while writing and producing songs. The album utilizes Stevens' characteristic guitar work, dance beats and synth-heavy production.

== Release and critical reception ==
Whiplash Smile received generally mixed reviews from music critics. Commercially the album achieved a success similar to his previous studio album, as it peaked at number six on the US Billboard 200. The album reached number eight in the United Kingdom, and also peaked inside the top 10 in many other countries, such as Australia, Canada, Germany, New Zealand, and Switzerland. Whiplash Smile was certified platinum by the Recording Industry Association of America (RIAA) and has sold more than two million copies worldwide.

Three singles were released from the album, with "To Be a Lover", "Don't Need a Gun" and "Sweet Sixteen" peaking into the top 40 on the Billboard Hot 100. "Soul Standing By" was released as a single only in Australia and New Zealand.

== Track listing ==
Whiplash Smile track listing
No.	Title	Writer(s)	Length
1.	"Worlds Forgotten Boy"	Billy Idol; Steve Stevens	5:40
2.	"To Be a Lover"	William Bell; Booker T. Jones	3:51
3.	"Soul Standing By"	Idol	4:35
4.	"Sweet Sixteen"	Idol	4:14
5.	"Man for All Seasons"	Idol; Stevens	4:38
6.	"Don't Need a Gun"	Idol	6:15
7.	"Beyond Belief"	Idol	4:00
8.	"Fatal Charm"	Idol; Stevens; Keith Forsey	3:51
9.	"All Summer Single"	Idol	4:33
10.	"One Night, One Chance"	Idol; Stevens	3:52
Total length:			45:29

== Personnel ==
Credits adapted from the album liner notes.

- Billy Idol – vocals, guitars, bass
- Steve Stevens – guitars, keyboards, programming, bass
- Phillip Ashley – keyboards
- Harold Faltermeyer – keyboards
- David Frank – keyboards
- Richard Tee – keyboards
- Marcus Miller – bass
- John Regan – bass
- Jocelyn Brown – backing vocals on "To Be a Lover"
- Connie Harvey – backing vocals on "To Be a Lover"
- Janet Wright – backing vocals on "To Be a Lover"

=== Production ===
- Keith Forsey – producer
- Dave Concors – engineer
- Neil Dorfsman – engineer
- Dave Wittman – engineer
- Debi Cornish – additional engineer
- Moira Marquis – additional engineer
- Bill Miranda – additional engineer
- Steve Tjaden – additional engineer
- Gary Langan – mixing at The Hit Factory (New York City)
- Craig Vogel – mix assistant
- George Marino – mastering at Sterling Sound (New York City)
- Bobby Deluca – production coordinator
- Jon Dworkow – production coordinator
- Artie Smith – production coordinator
- Billy Idol – art direction, illustration
- Frank Olinsky (Manhattan Design) – art direction, illustration
- Pat Gorman (Manhattan Design) – art direction, illustration
- Albert Sanchez – front cover photography
- Carolyn Greyshock – photography
- Herb Ritts – photography
- John Peden – photography
- Gary Allen – wardrobe stylist

== Charts ==
=== Weekly charts ===
Weekly chart performance for Whiplash Smile
Chart (1986–1987)	Peak position
Australian Albums (Kent Music Report)	6
Austrian Albums (Ö3 Austria)	18
Canada Top Albums/CDs (RPM)	6
Dutch Albums (Album Top 100)	30
European Albums (Music & Media)	13
Finnish Albums (Suomen virallinen lista)	3
German Albums (Offizielle Top 100)	9
Icelandic Albums (Tónlist)	5
Italian Albums (Musica e dischi)	15
New Zealand Albums (RMNZ)	5
Norwegian Albums (VG-lista)	12
Swedish Albums (Sverigetopplistan)	4
Swiss Albums (Schweizer Hitparade)	4
UK Albums (Official Charts)	8
US Billboard 200	6

=== Year-end charts ===
1986 year-end chart performance for Whiplash Smile
Chart (1986)	Position
Canada Top Albums/CDs (RPM)	37

1987 year-end chart performance for Whiplash Smile
Chart (1987)	Position
Australian Albums (Kent Music Report)	12
Canada Top Albums/CDs (RPM)	52
European Albums (Music & Media)	63
German Albums (Offizielle Top 100)	22
New Zealand Albums (RMNZ)	34
US Billboard 200	28

== Certifications ==
Certifications for Whiplash Smile
Region	Certification	Certified units/sales
Canada (Music Canada)	3× Platinum	300,000^{^}
Finland (Musiikkituottajat)	Gold	25,000
Germany (BVMI)	Gold	250,000^{^}
New Zealand (RMNZ)	Platinum	15,000^{^}
Switzerland (IFPI Switzerland)	Gold	25,000^{^}
United Kingdom (BPI)	Gold	100,000^{^}
United States (RIAA)	Platinum	1,000,000^{^}
^{^} Shipments figures based on certification alone.
