= Andrejs Plakans =

Latvian-American historian (1940–2024)

Andrejs Plakans (December 31, 1940 – July 4, 2024) was a Latvian-American historian. He was emeritus professor of history at Iowa State University.

== Early life and education ==
Andrejs Plakans was born during the World War II on December 31, 1940, in Riga, Latvian SSR, USSR as the second son of Alfrēds and Klāra (Ozola) Plakans. In July 1944, fleeing the re-occupation of Latvia by the Soviet Union, the Plakans family went into exile, living out the rest of WWII in Reichenberg in the Sudetenland part of Czechoslovakia. After the war, the family moved farther west, spending the next six years in displaced persons’ (DP) camps in the American occupation zone in Germany. In 1951, they emigrated to the United States, settling in Lancaster, Pennsylvania.

Andrejs Plakans graduated from J.P. McCaskey High School (1959), received a B.A. in history and political science from Franklin & Marshall College (1963), and a M.A. and Ph.D. in history from Harvard University (1969).

== Career ==
Starting his academic career as a history instructor at Boston College (1967), Andrejs Plakans became an associate professor of history at Iowa State University, later professor, department chair twice, and retired as a professor emeritus (1975–2006). During leaves of absence from ISU, he did research at University of Massachusetts Amherst, University of California-Riverside, University of Pittsburgh, Smithsonian Woodrow Wilson Center, Washington, D.C., and University of Latvia, Riga.

From 1988 till 1990 Andrejs Plakans served as president of the Association for the Advancement of Baltic Studies.

Andrejs Plakans was awarded foreign membership status by the Latvian Academy of Sciences (1990), an honorary Ph.D. from Umeå University in Sweden (1999), and the Order of the Three Stars, the highest civilian award for meritorious service to Latvia (2017).

== Death ==
Plakans died on July 4, 2024, at the age of 83.

== Bibliography ==
=== Books ===
- A Concise History of the Baltic States (Cambridge University Press, 2011)
- The Latvians: A Short History (Hoover Institution Press, 1995)
- Kinship in the Past: An Anthropology of European Family Life, 1500-1900 (B. Blackwell, 1984)
- Historical Dictionary of Latvia (Scarecrow Press, 1997)
- Experiencing Totalitarianism: The Invasion and Occupation of Latvia by the USSR and Nazi Germany 1939-1991 (AuthorHouse, 2014)
- The Reluctant Exiles: Latvians in the West after World War II (Brill Schoningh, 2021)

=== Editor ===
Family History at the Crossroads: A Journal of Family History Reader
