= Christopher Zarins =

American physician

- Kristaps (Kristofers) Zariņš
- Born: December 2, 1943 (age 82); Tukums, Latvia
- Citizenship: United States, Latvia
- Education: BA, Lehigh University (1964); MD, Johns Hopkins University School of Medicine (1968)
- Occupations: Surgeon, researcher, professor, entrepreneur
- Years active: 1969-present
- Known for: HeartFlow

Christopher K. Zarins (born on 2 December 1943 in Tukums, Latvia) is an American-Latvian surgeon and professor emeritus who specializes in vascular biology and pathology.

== Early life and education ==
Zarins was born during the Second World War in 1943 in the family of Tukums Lutheran pastor Rihards Zariņš (1913–2006) and English teacher Maria Zarinš. In October 1944, he fled to Sweden with his parents and in November 1946 he moved to the United States.

In 1960, he graduated from the Brooklyn Technical High School in New York. In 1964, he graduated from Lehigh University with B.A. in biology. In 1968, he received his Doctor of Medicine (M.D.) degree from Johns Hopkins University in Baltimore.

From 1968 to 1973, he worked at the Johns Hopkins Hospital, from 1974 to 1979 at the US Navy Medical Center in San Diego. From 1976 to 1993, he taught at the University of Chicago, was a vascular surgeon at the Medical Center, in 1982 he became a professor. In 1993, he moved to California where he began working as a vascular surgeon at Stanford University Medical Center.

== Scientific work ==
Zarins is an author or co-author of more than 15 books and more than 350 scientific articles in the fields of vascular biomechanics and pathobiology of atherosclerosis, carotid stenosis, aortic aneurysms and endovascular therapy.

=== HeartFlow ===
In 2007, Zarins together with biomedical engineer Charles Anthony Taylor founded HeartFlow, Inc., a medical technology company based in Redwood City, California, that developed non-invasive, real-time virtual modeling tool for coronary artery disease (CAD) intervention using estimation of fractional flow reserve (FFR).
