= Valters Nollendorfs =

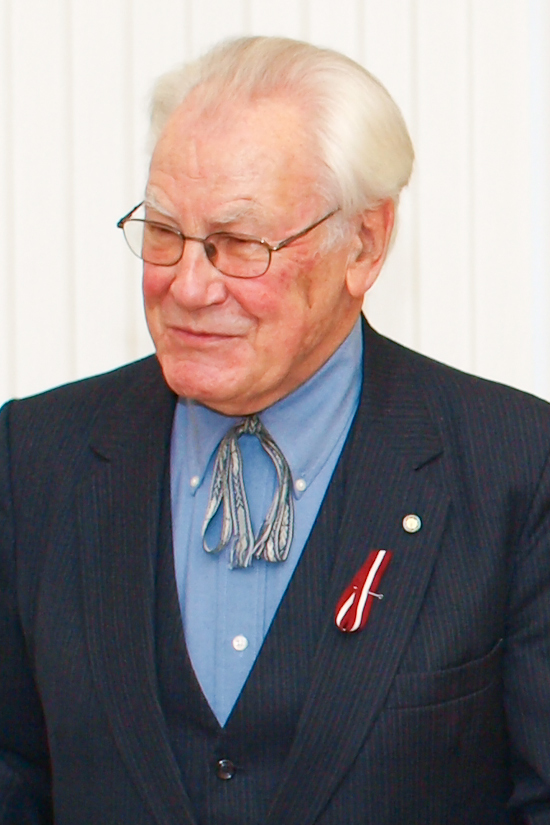
Valters Nollendorfs in 2011

Valters Nollendorfs is board chair of the Museum of the Occupation of Latvia and a professor emeritus of German language and literature at the University of Wisconsin–Madison.

Nollendorfs was born 22 March 1931 in Riga, Latvia, where his father, Kārlis Nollendorfs, was a police officer in the Old Town. At the age of thirteen, together with his family, he fled Latvia to Westphalia, Germany, where he spent almost six years in a displaced persons camp. In 1950 he emigrated to Texas. In 1954 he received a B.S. in pedagogy at the University of Nebraska, and in 1955 he completed an M.A. in German language and literature there. In 1962 he earned a Ph.D. in German literature at the University of Michigan, submitting a dissertation on Goethe's Faust. From 1961 until his retirement in 1994, Nollendorfs taught at the University of Wisconsin–Madison, where he chaired the Department of German from 1975 to 1980 and again from 1984 to 1988. In 1981–82, he chaired the Division of 18th and Early 19th Century German Literature of the Modern Language Association.

At the age of 24, Nollendorfs became the first editor of the Latvian-language journal Jaunā Gaita (New Tide). In the late 1950s he was in charge of the American Latvian Youth Association. He worked for the children's magazine Mazputniņš and the publishing company Ceļinieks, and he conducted many courses for young people in North America. During the academic year 1988/89, he directed the only full-time Latvian high school in the Free World, the Münster Latvian High School in Germany. Beginning in 1974, he held various offices in the Association for the Advancement of Baltic Studies, ultimately serving as its president and as executive director of academics. Since 1982 he has been affiliated with the Baltische Historische Kommission.

In 1988, after living in the diaspora for many years, Nollendorfs returned for a visit to Latvia, where in 1990 he became one of the first Fulbright lecturers. He has been a member of the Latvian Academy of Sciences since 1990 and member of the President of Latvia's Historians Commission since 1998. From 1996 to 2000 he was director of the Association for the Advancement of Baltic Studies' Baltic office.

Over the years Nollendorfs has authored two books and edited more than fifteen volumes (including With Dance Shoes in Siberian Snows by Sandra Kalniete). He has also served as the editor of scholarly journals, including Monatshefte at the University of Wisconsin–Madison.

== Selected publications ==
- (with Valters Ščerbinskis), The Impossible Resistance: Latvia Between Two Totalitarian Regimes, 1940–1991. Riga: Zinatne, 2021. ISBN 978-9-93-459922-4.
- (with Erwin Oberländer), The Hidden and Forbidden History of Latvia under Soviet and Nazi Occupations, 1940–1991. (Lātvijas Vēsturnieku komisija.) Riga: Institute of the History of Latvia, 2005. ISBN 978-9-98-460192-2.
- "'For Poems Are Forever Spirals without End': A Meditative Letter to Ivar Ivask (1927–1992) on His Baltic Elegies." Journal of Baltic Studies 26:2 (Summer 1995): 89-106. ISSN 1751-7877 <https://www.jstor.org/stable/43211948>
- "Out of Germanistik: Thoughts on the Shape of Things to Come." Die Unterrichtspraxis 27:1 (Spring, 1994): 1–10.
- (with Robert DiDonato), "Taking the Conference to the Teachers: Workshops to Improve Language Teaching." Foreign Language Annals 16:1 (February 1983): 21–26.
- (co-editor), DAAD–Monatshefe Directory of German Studies: Departments, Programs and Faculties in the United States and Canada. Madison: University of Wisconsin Press (1980, 1985, 1990 and 1995).
- (co-editor, with Walter F. W. Lohnes), German Studies in the United States: Assessment and Outlook. (Monatshefte Occasional Volumes, no. 1.) Madison: University of Wisconsin Press, 1976. ISBN 978-0-29-997010-9.
- "Riga in the Lyric Poetry of the Postwar Latvian Generation." Journal of Baltic Studies 5:2 (Summer 1974): 100–111. ISSN 1751-7877 <https://www.jstor.org/stable/43210560>
- "The Demythologization of Latvian Literature." Books Abroad 47:4 (Autumn 1973): 664–674. ISSN 0006-7431 <https://doi.org/10.2307/40127549>
- Der Streit um den Urfaust. (Studies in German Literature.) Berlin: Mouton, 1967. ISBN 978-3-11-118962-8.

== Awards ==
Nollendorfs was decorated a knight of the Order of the Three Stars on 2 May 1997 and an officer of the Order of Merit of the Federal Republic of Germany on 5 December 2017.
