= Perri Lister =

British actress, singer and dancer (born 1959)

- Born: Perry Lister; 10 April 1959 (age 67); London, England
- Occupations: Dancer; singer; actress
- Years active: 1977−present
- Partner: Billy Idol (1980–1989)
- Children: Willem Wolfe Broad (son)

Perri Lister (born 10 April 1959) is an English dancer, singer and actress. She was a dancer with the British dance troupe Hot Gossip which appeared regularly on The Kenny Everett Video Show in the late 1970s and early 1980s in the United Kingdom. In the 1980s Lister was a backing vocalist for a number of pop music acts, including Billy Idol, with whom she had a nine-year relationship.

== Early life ==
Perri Lister was born on 10 April 1959 in London, England, the daughter of Bert Lister, a stage manager, dresser and chauffeur, by his third wife, stage actress Gail Kendall. Her paternal grandmother was an amateur opera singer.

== Entertainment career ==
In 1978, Lister was a member of the dance troupe Hot Gossip, which performed on British television's The Kenny Everett Video Show. They were noted for their sexually suggestive costumes and risqué dance routines. Lister was one of the original Blitz Kids, a group of young, flamboyantly dressed people who patronised the Covent Garden clubs night Blitz in the early 1980s, among whom were Boy George, Steve Strange, Spandau Ballet, and Marilyn. She appeared as a dancer in the 1980 musical comedy film Can't Stop the Music.

Lister began a relationship with rock singer Billy Idol in 1980, over whom she allegedly exerted a big influence. She sang the French lyrical backing vocal chorus, "Les yeux sans visage" on his 1984 hit single "Eyes Without a Face"; and appeared in several of his music videos, including "White Wedding" in which she played the bride; "To Be a Lover"; and she was the girl bound to a cross in the second video for his song "Hot in the City". Mademoiselle described Lister's sexy performance in the latter video as "sizzling". She danced topless in the 1982 Duran Duran video for the single release "The Chauffeur", and sang backing vocals for the band Visage, and August Darnell's band Kid Creole and the Coconuts.

She was a member of the short-lived pop music group Boomerang, which consisted of two former members of Kid Creole and the Coconuts: Adriana Kaegi and Cheryl Poirier. The group released an album titled Boomerang (1986) and a cover version of "These Boots Are Made for Walkin'".

== Personal life ==
Lister and Billy Idol together have a son, who was born in Los Angeles, California on 15 June 1988. When an American model held a press conference claiming to be Idol's girlfriend, Lister responded by holding one of her own, maintaining that she was "and always had been Idol's girlfriend". The couple broke up in 1989.

As of 2017, Lister resides in London, UK.

== Filmography ==
- Can't Stop the Music (1980) as a dancer
- Eternity (1989) as Sean's secretary
- Freddy's Nightmares (1989), television series, as Lucy
- Bad Influence (1990) as Claire's friend
- Hunter (1990) as Cherry
- Michael Angel (1998) as Sylvia Masters
- 2 Dudes and a Dream (2009) as Mrs. Price

== Discography ==
- The Anvil (1982), Polydor
- Tropical Gangsters (1982), Island Records
- Don't Take My Coconuts (1983), EMI America
- Doppelganger (1983), Island Records
- Rebel Yell (1983), Chrysalis
- Boomerang (1986), Atlantic Records
- "These Boots Are Made for Walkin'" (1986), Atlantic Records
