= Latvian Americans =

Specific demographic of the American population

Amerikas latvieši (Latvian)
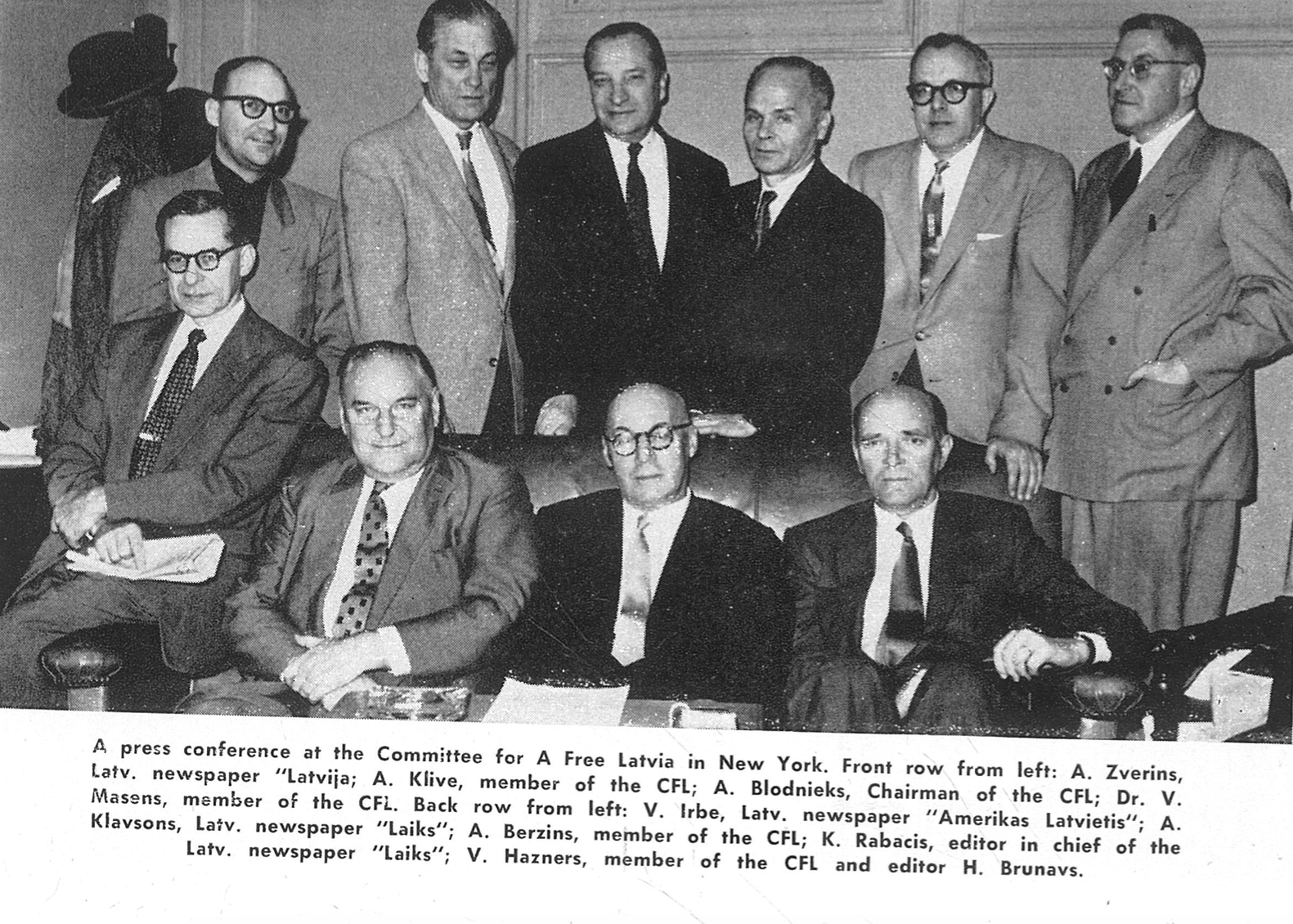
- Latvian American activists in 1988

Total population
- 75,540 (2025)

Regions with significant populations
- California, New York, Florida, Illinois, Michigan, Wisconsin, Minnesota

Languages
- American English, Latvian

Religion
- Mostly Lutheranism with Roman Catholic and Jewish minority

Related ethnic groups
- Lithuanian Americans, Estonian Americans, Latvian Canadians, Latvian New Zealanders, Latvian Australians, Scandinavian Americans

Latvian Americans (Latvian: Amerikas latvieši) are Americans who are of Latvian ancestry. According to the 2025 American Community Survey, there are 75,540 Americans of full or partial Latvian descent.

== History ==
The first significant wave of Latvian settlers who immigrated to the United States came in 1888 to Boston. By the end of the century, many of those Latvian immigrants had moved on to settle primarily in other East Coast and Midwest cities, such as New York City, Philadelphia, Cleveland, and Chicago, as well as coastal cities on the West Coast, such as Seattle, Portland, Los Angeles, and San Francisco. Although most Latvians settled in cities, in most of these (with the exception of the Roxbury district of Boston) they lived dispersed and did not form ethnic neighborhoods.

Some immigrants also established themselves in rural areas, but they were few and usually did not form long-lasting communities. The first Lutheran church built by Latvians in the United States was erected in 1906 in Lincoln County, Wisconsin, where an agricultural colony had been established in 1897.

A new wave of Latvian immigration began around 1906, after the failure of the 1905 Russian Revolution. Many of these immigrants were political leaders and rank-and-file revolutionaries who could be killed by Russian soldiers if they were discovered, so they emigrated to survive and continue the revolutionary movement in other countries. Most of the Latvian revolutionaries were more politically radical than the earlier immigrants to the United States, which increased social friction within a number of communities.

In 1917, many Latvian revolutionaries returned to their homeland to work for the creation of a Bolshevik government. In 1918, when Latvia declared its independence, some nationalists also returned.

Latvian Lutheran Church, Willimantic, Connecticut

After World War I, the promise of economic improvements in the newly independent nation, immigration quotas established in 1924 by the United States, and the Great Depression all contributed to reduced emigration from Latvia to the US. From 1920 to 1939, only 4,669 Latvians arrived in the United States.

Toward the end of World War II, tens of thousands of Latvians fled their country to Western Europe to escape advancing Soviet troops. Most were held in Displaced Persons camps. About half were eventually repatriated to the then-Latvian Soviet Socialist Republic, but the rest resettled to Germany, the United Kingdom, Ireland, Iceland, France, Belgium, the Netherlands, Australia, Canada, New Zealand, and the United States. From 1939 to 1951, 40,000 Latvians immigrated to the United States with the help of the U.S. government and various social service and religious organizations. Although many of these refugees had been professionals in their country, in the United States they often had to take jobs as farmhands, custodians, or builders until they could learn English and find better paying jobs.

Most Latvians settled in cities because of economic opportunities, such as New York, Boston, Philadelphia, and Chicago. They did not settle in ethnic neighborhoods and relied on social events and the press for a sense of community. Within a few years, Latvian organizations created schools, credit unions, choirs, dance groups, theater troupes, publishers and book sellers, churches, veterans' groups (e.g. the Daugavas vanagi, Hawks of Daugava), and political organizations to help continue their culture and language. Since the annexation of the Baltic states was not recognized by the United States and many other countries, many kept Latvian passports, issued by the Latvian Embassy in Washington D.C., but most acquired American citizenship as well.

From 1980 to 1990, 1,006 Latvians arrived in the United States.

Latvia reestablished its independence in 1991; however, few of the later immigrants or descendants of earlier generations have returned. They have made new lives in the United States.

== Demography ==
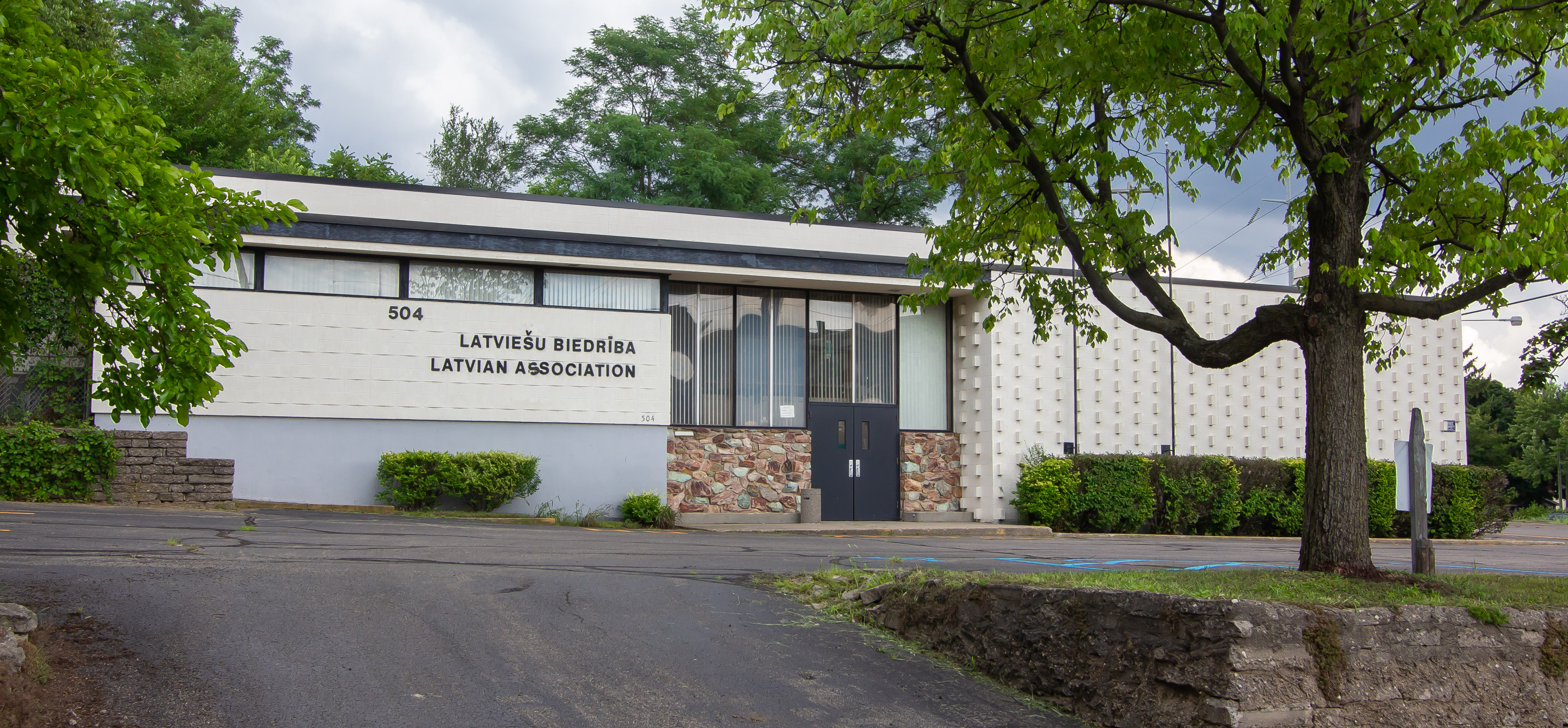
Grand Rapids Latvian Society (Latviešu biedrība) Hall and Latvian Apostolate

According to the 2000 census, a total of 87,564 people of Latvian descent lived in the United States. The larger populations are located in the states of California, New York, Illinois, Florida, and Massachusetts. Many Latvian Americans (about 9,000) have dual citizenship, which the country made available to emigrants after becoming independent of the Soviet Union. Since the late 20th century, more Latvian Americans have traveled back to Latvia. Others provide financial support and give material to various organizations. Some Latvian Americans have settled there and been elected to the Saeima, or Parliament, in Latvia.

The states with the largest Latvian-American populations are:

| California | 11,443 |
| (New York (state)) New York | 9,937 |
| Illinois | 6,982 |
| Florida | 4,921 |
| Massachusetts | 4,706 |
| Michigan | 4,265 |
| New Jersey | 3,946 |
| Pennsylvania | 3,754 |
| Washington | 3,380 |
| Maryland | 3,289 |
| Ohio | 2,362 |

=== Latvian-born population ===
Latvian-born population in the US since 2010:

| Year | Number |
|---|---|
| 2010 | 23,218 |
| 2011 | ▼22,257 |
| 2012 | ▼24,131 |
| 2013 | ▲24,497 |
| 2014 | ▼21,097 |
| 2015 | ▲21,364 |
| 2016 | ▲24,691 |
| 2025 | ▼22,521 |

== Education ==
The majority of Latvians immigrants to the United States after World War II were university graduates. Many were academics or belonged to intelligentsia.

== Languages and religions ==
Most Latvian Americans speak only English due to intermarriage. As for religion, although most Latvians Americans are Lutherans, there are also Catholic communities, represented by the American Latvian Catholic Association, as well as American Latvian Baptists and American Latvian Jewish communities.

== Notable people ==
- Rutanya Alda (Rūta Skrastiņa, born 1942), actress (Mommy Dearest, The Deer Hunter)
- Jessie Andrews (born 1992), pornographic actress, model, and club DJ
- Elya Baskin (Ilya Zalmanovich Baskin, born 1950), character actor (Moscow on the Hudson, Spider-Man 2, Spider-Man 3)
- Aldis Berzins (Aldis Bērziņš, born 1956), member of the United States men's national volleyball team that won the gold medal at the 1984 Summer Olympics
- Gunnar Birkerts (Gunārs Birkerts, 1925–2017), architect (Corning Museum of Glass, Marquette Plaza in Minneapolis, Minnesota, the Kemper Museum of Contemporary Art, the U.S. Embassy in Caracas, Venezuela, National Library of Latvia, Riga)
- Sven Birkerts (Svens Birkerts, born 1951), essayist and literary critic
- David P. Boder (born Aron Mendel Michelson, 1886–1961), psychologist known for the first audio recordings of Holocaust survivors (I Did Not Interview the Dead, 1949)
- Aris Brimanis (Āris Brīmanis, born 1972), ice hockey player
- Chase Budinger (Čeiss Badingers, born 1988), NBA basketball player
- Christopher Zarins (born 1943), surgeon, researcher
- Eric Cantor (born 1963), Republican Representative of Virginia's 7th congressional district from 2001 to 2014, and Majority Leader from 2011 to 2014, until his historic primary defeat by Dave Brat.
- Vija Celmins (Vija Celmiņš, born 1938), painter; won a Fellow Award in the Visual Arts from United States Artists in 2009
- David Cohen (1917–2020), a member of the US Army, a liberator of the Ohrdruf concentration camp, and a schoolteacher
- Jacob Davis (Jēkabs Jufess, 1831–1908), tailor, inventor of denim
- Burkards Dzenis (1879–1966), artist
- Buddy Ebsen (1908–2003), actor and dancer; known for his role as Jed Clampett in the popular television series The Beverly Hillbillies
- Andrievs Ezergailis (1930–2022), historian of the Holocaust
- Corey Fogelmanis (born 1999), actor
- Paul Grasmanis (Pols Grasmanis, born 1974), former NFL American football player
- Dave Grusin (born 1934), jazz musician; known for his musical score in the movies such as Tootsie and Heaven Can Wait
- Natalie Gulbis (born 1983), LPGA golfer
- Moriss Halle (1923–2018), linguist
- Philippe Halsman (Filips Halsmans, 1906–1979), photographer
- Juris Hartmanis (1928–2022), computer scientist, Turing Award winner (1993)
- Rashida Jones (born 1976), actress
- Kristaps Keggi (1934–2023), orthopedic surgeon
- Martin Kersels (born 1960), artist, professor of sculpture and director of graduate studies at the Yale School of Art
- Mike Knuble (Maiks Knuble, born 1972), NHL ice hockey player
- Mārtiņš Krūmiņš (1900–1992), Impressionist painter
- Edward Leedskalnin (Edvards Liedskalniņš, 1887–1951), amateur sculptor;, builder of Coral Castle in Florida; claimed to have discovered the ancient magnetic levitation secrets used to construct the Egyptian pyramids
- Ari Leff (Ari Steprenss Līfs, born 1994), singer, songwriter and record producer
- DJ Lethal (Leors Dimants, born 1972), DJ for rap-rock band Limp Bizkit, of Jewish descent
- Martins Licis (born 1990), professional strongman
- Peggy Lipton (1946–2019), actress
- Juris Luzins (Juris Luziņš, born 1947), 1971 US National Championship winner in the men's 800-meter run
- Cynthia Lynn (Zinta Valda Ziemelis, 1937–2014), actress
- Leo Mihelsons (1887–1978), artist
- J. George Mikelsons (born 1938), airline executive
- Nils Muižnieks (born 1964), human rights activist and political scientist
- Peters Munters, musician with the bands Over it and Runner Runner
- Fred Norris (Fred Leo Nukis, born 1955), Howard Stern show personality
- Lucia Peka (Lūcija Pēka, 1912–1991), artist, painter of "Flowers", "Riga", and "The Well"
- Brita Petersons (Brita Pētersone, born 1979), model
- Andrejs Plakans, historian (1940–2024)
- Gundaris Pone (1932–1994), composer and conductor
- Eugene Revitch (1909–1996), psychiatrist
- Lolita Ritmanis (born 1962), orchestrator, composer
- Laila Robins (Laila Robiņa, born 1959), stage, film and television actress
- Henry Rollins (born 1961), musician, performance artist
- Mark Rothko (Markus Rotkovičs, 1903–1970), painter
- Raimonds Staprans (Raimonds Staprāns, 1926–2026), Latvian/American painter and playwright (The Freezing, 1979; Four Days in June, 1989)
- Harold Snepsts (Haralds Šnepsts, born 1954), NHL ice hockey player
- Esther Sans Takeuchi (Estere Sāns-Takeuči, born 1953), Greatbatch Professor of Advanced Power Sources at University of Buffalo; recipient of the National Medal of Technology and Innovation, 2009
- Eva Saulitis (1963–2016), marine biologist and poet
- Andrew Smith (born 1992), American-Latvian basketball player in the Israeli Basketball Premier League
- Peter Tillers (Pēteris Tillers, 1943–2015), legal scholar
- Juris Upatnieks (1936–2026), physicist; co-inventor of three-dimensional holography; created the first working hologram in 1962
- Max Weinreich (Makss Veinreihs, 1893–1969), linguist
- Tati Westbrook (born 1982), YouTuber, makeup artist and Internet personality
- DeAndre Yedlin (born 1993), soccer player for the Seattle Sounders and the United States National Soccer team
- Markus Zusevics (Markuss Zuševics, born 1989), NFL football player

== See also ==
- European Americans
- List of Latvians
- Latvians
- Latvia–United States relations
- White Americans
