= Don't Need a Gun =

Single by Billy Idol

from the album Whiplash Smile
- B-side: "Fatal Charm"
- Released: January 1987 (US); 23 February 1987 (UK)
- Genre: Rock
- Length: 6:15 (album version); 4:28 (7-inch version)
- Label: Chrysalis
- Songwriter: Billy Idol
- Producer: Keith Forsey

Billy Idol singles chronology
"To Be a Lover" (1986)	"Don't Need a Gun" (1987)	"Sweet Sixteen" (1987)

Audio sample
- file; help

Music video
- "Don't Need a Gun" on YouTube

"Don't Need a Gun" is a song by the English rock singer Billy Idol, released in 1987 as the second single from his third studio album, Whiplash Smile (1986). The song, written by Idol and produced by Keith Forsey, combines rock, pop and dance with lyrics on the dangers of firearms. The 7-inch single, backed with Whiplash Smile album track "Fatal Charm", is shortened to four minutes and 28 seconds from the six minute and 15 second album version.

While not as successful as the prior or following singles, "To Be a Lover" and "Sweet Sixteen" respectively, the song reached #37 on the Billboard Hot 100, and #10 on the Mainstream Rock chart. A music video, directed by Julien Temple, continued Idol's success on MTV.

== Composition and lyrics ==
"Don't Need a Gun" is a rock song, with elements of punk rock, hard rock and "dancefloor-friendly beats." According to the sheet music published at Musicnotes.com by BMG Rights Management, the song is written in the key of E major and is set in the time signature of common time with a tempo of 120 beats per minute. The verses have an atmospheric, "new wave-ish" sound, making use of synthesizers, giving way to more rock-influenced choruses.

Written by Billy Idol, the song has lyrics on the dangers of firearms, knives and Russian roulette. The chorus of "Don't Need a Gun" references the songs "Tutti Frutti", "Flip, Flop and Fly" and "Lawdy Miss Clawdy". The final verse name-checks Elvis Presley, Johnnie Ray and Gene Vincent.

== Background and release ==
Billy Idol and guitarist Steve Stevens had traveled to London in 1986 to mix "Don't Need a Gun", which they recorded in 1985–1986 with the rest of Whiplash Smile, and to find new band members. On The Beat spotted the two in the VIP room of the, then newly opened, Limelight nightclub. A couple of nights later, Idol returned to celebrate his 31st birthday with a few friends.

"Don't Need a Gun" was released in the US as the second single from Whiplash Smile in January 1987. While not as successful as the previous single, "To Be a Lover", the song was another top 40 hit for Idol, and charted even higher when released in the UK on 23 February 1987. The strength of the two singles, and the following "Sweet Sixteen" helped the album tie with Rebel Yell (1983) as Idol's most successful on the Billboard 200.

== Music video ==
The music video, directed by Julien Temple, features Idol and Stevens performing the song at a liquor store crime scene in Hollywood.

== Track listing ==
No.	Title	Writer(s)	Length
1.	"Don't Need a Gun"	Billy Idol	4:30
2.	"Fatal Charm"	Idol; Steven Stevens; Keith Forsey	3:51

== Personnel ==
Credits adapted from Whiplash Smile liner notes.

- Billy Idol – vocals, guitars, bass
- Steve Stevens – guitars, keyboards, programming, bass
- Phillip Ashley – keyboards
- Harold Faltermeyer – keyboards
- David Frank – keyboards
- Richard Tee – keyboards
- Marcus Miller – bass
- John Regan – bass
- Keith Forsey – producer

== Charts ==
Chart (1987)	Peak position
Australia (Kent Music Report)	22
Germany	36
New Zealand (Recorded Music NZ)	27
Switzerland (Schweizer Hitparade)	29
UK Singles (Official Charts)	26
US Billboard Hot 100	37
US Mainstream Rock (Billboard)	10
