= Yoshiko Noguchi =

Japanese scholar of German literature

Yoshiko Noguchi (Japanese: 野口 芳子, born 7 July 1949) is one of the leading researchers on Grimm's Fairy tales in Japan. She is a professor of German, comparative literature, cultural studies, children's literature, folklore, and gender studies. She is a professor emeritus at Mukogawa Women's University and a professor at division of children's literature, graduate school of Letters, Baika Women's University. She was born in Osaka and her maiden name is Hiiragi (Japanese: 柊木). She is different from other researchers in that she discusses how Grimm's fairy tales are accepted in Japan and the UK from an interdisciplinary perspective. She has recently unraveled a long-standing mystery in the history of German-Japanese cultural exchange. She successfully identified three Japanese that visited Jacob Grimm in Berlin in 1862.

== Education ==
Noguchi received a B.A. in German literature through the Department of German Studies, Faculty of Letters, Kwansei Gakuin University in 1972 and an M.A. in German literature through the same graduate school in 1974. She subsequently studied European ethnology under Ingeborg Weber-Kellermann at Philipps University of Marburg, Germany, as a research fellow at the Rotary International Foundation. She earned her PhD in European ethnology in 1977 from there. The title of her dissertation is "German: Rezeption der Kinder- und Hausmärchen der Brüder Grimm in Japan (Reception of the Grimm's Fairy Tales in Japan)".

== Career ==
Since 1983, she worked as a full-time lecturer at Mukogawa Women's University, as an associate professor since 1990, and as a professor since 1998. She became an emeritus professor in 2016. Since 2017, she is a professor at Graduate School of Letters, Baika Women's University.

She belongs to the International Society for Folk Narrative Research, Brüder Grimm-Gesellschaft (Brothers Grimm Society), Japan Society for German Literature, Japan Society for Gender Studies, Japan Society for Children's Literature, Japan Society for Folktale Studies and Women's Studies Association of Japan.

She is an Academic Advisor ("Wissenschaftlicher Rat") of Brüder Grimm-Gesellschaft, Kassel since 2012.

She is an executive member of Japan Society for Gender Studies and Japan Society for Folktale Studies.

She is the president of the Study Circle of Grimm and German Folktales and she was the president Japan Society for Gender Studies (2017–2019) and the Study Circle of Women's Studies of Mukogawa Women's University (1999–2018).

She was a judge of Grants-in-Aid for Scientific Research of Japan Society for the Promotion of Science.

Noguchi's languages of research include Japanese, German and English. Her treatise, interpreted from a gender perspective, overturns the traditional stereotypes of "Cinderella" and "Snow White," and is very innovative and interesting. She also represents her book comparing witches in Grimm's Fairy Tales with defendants in real-life witch trials.

== Books ==
=== Single ===
- Metaphors in Grimm's Fairy Tales, Keiso-shobo, 2016.
- Let's Enjoy Academic Theses, Mukogawa-Woman-Uni, 2012.
- Grimms' Fairy Tales and Witches: Historical Aspects of Witch-Hunting and Gender, Keiso-shobo, 2002.
- Grimms' Fairy Tales: Their Dreams and Realities, Keiso-shobo, 1994.

=== Multiple ===
- Jahrbuch der Brüder Grimm-Gesellschaft (Yearbook of the Brothers Grimm Society) 2009–2020, XIX-XX, Kassel, 2019.
- Grimm's Fairy Tales as Cultural Phenomena, bensei-shuppan, 2017.
- A Door to the World of the Brothers Grimm, bensei-shuppan, 2015.
- Images of Father and Mother in "the German Legends" of the Brothers Grimm. In: Japan Society of Gender Studies (17), Aug.2014, 13–24.
- Grimms and Folkrore: A Horizon from Ost- and Westfolktales' Research, Aso-shuppan, 2013.
- Let's Study German with Witches, Sanshu-sha, 2008.
- The Comprehensive List of Children Literature translated into Japanese, Nada shuppan Center/ Daikuh-sha, 2005.
- Handbook of World Fairy Tales, Sanseido, 2004.
- Daß gepfleget werde der feste Buchstab, Trier (WVT) 2001.
- History Records of German Women, Sanshu-sha, 2001.
- Bibliography of Japanese Translations of Grimm's Fairy Tales, Nada shuppan Center, 2001.
- Lexicon of Children's Literature in Japan, Vol. 2, Dai-nippon-tosho, 1993.
- Lexicon of World History, Vol. 6, kyoiku shuppan center, 1985.
- Europäische Ethnologie in der beruflichen Praxis (European Ethnology in Professional Practice), Bonn (Habelt), 1983.
- Brüder Grimm Gedenken (Brothers Grimm commemoration), Bd.3, Marburg/L (Elwert), 1981.

=== Translation ===
- Ingrid Ahrendt-Schulte, Women treated as Witches, Mariko Koyama (joint transl.), Keiso-shobo, 2003.

== Articles ==
- "Reception of Grimm's Fairy Tales in Japan: A Study of German Textbooks from the Meiji and Taisho Eras", Baika Women's University Faculty of Psychology and Children's Studies bulletin (11), 2021, 10–21.
- "Snakes in the Fairy Tales and German Legends of the Brothers Grimm", The Baika Journal of Children's Literature (28), 2021, 43–61.
- "Reception of "Little Red Riding Hood" in Japan: Focusing on the Heisei Era", Baika Women's University Faculty of Psychology and Children's Studies bulletin (10), 2020, 1–12.
- "The Reception of Little Red Riding Hood in Japan: Focusing on the Showa Era (1926–1988) ", The Baika Journal of Children's Literature (27), 2019, 86–103.
- "Reception of "Little Red Riding Hood" in Japan: Focusing on the Meiji and Taisho Eras", Folktales: Studies and Materials (47), 2019, 79–93.
- ""Rotkäppchen" in Japan: Aka Eri Musume", Brüder Grimm-Journal (10), Frühjar 2019, Kassel 2019, 22–23.
- "The Reception of 'Little Red Riding Hood' during the Meiji Era in Japan: Focusing on the First Translation and the Translator", The Baika Journal of Children's Literature (26), 2018, 94–110.
- "Japanese Visitors to Jacob Grimm in Berlin 1862", Falktales: Studies and Materials(44), 2016, 103–117.
- "Grimms' Fariy Tales in Romaji Alphabet: The Translation in the Romaji Zasshi and Their Translators", The Bulletin of MUKOGAWA WOMEN'S UNIVERSITY (63), 2015, 1–12.
- "Influences of Victorian Values on Japanese Versions of Grimms' Fairy Tales", Fabula (56), Heft1/2 2015, 67–78.
- "Images of Father and Mother in "the German Legends" of the Brothers Grimm", Japan Society of Gender Studies (17), 2014, 13–24.
- "A Subversive View of Conventional Idea About 'Snow White' :A Study of Grimms' Fairy Tales from the Perspective of Gender Studies", Japan Society of Gender Studies (15), 2012, 27–41.
- "Die Zahl "Sieben" in den Grimmschen Märchen: Über das Vorkommen der unglücklichen Sieben (The Number "Seven" in Grimm's Fairy Tales: About the Occurrence of the Unfortunate Seven) ", Forschungsberichte zur Germanistik (53), 2011, 7-29.
- "A Subversive View of Conventional Ideas About 'Cinderella': A Study of Grimms' Fairy Tales from the Perspective of Gender Studies", The Bulletin of MUKOGAWA WOMEN'S UNIVERSITY. Humanities and Social Science (58), 2010, 1–11.
- "Japanese Translation of Grimms' Fairy Tales Influenced by English Translations：Focusing on Early Translations and English Textbooks in the Meiji Era", Falktales: Studies and Materials (38), 2010, 22–35.
- "Provokative Ansichten zu konventionellen Vorstellungen über das Märchen Dornrösche (Provocative Views on Conventional Ideas about the Fairy Tale Sleeping Beauty)", Studienreihe der Japanischen Gesellschaft für Germanistik: Erforschung der Grimmschen Märchen (50), 2007, 28–38.
- "Hexenbilder in der Volksliteratur: Am Beispiel der "Kinder und Hausmärchen" und der "Deutschen Sagen" der Brüder Grimm", Journal of Gender Studies Japan (8), 2005, 1–12.
- "Victim of Witch-Hunting", Journal of Gender Studies Japan (2), 1999, 1–15.
- "Hexe und Stiefmutter: Extrembeispiele des Bösen in den Grimmschen Märchen (Witch and Stepmother: Extreme Examples of Evil in Grimm's Fairy Tales)", Journal of Women's Studies Association of Mukogawa Women's University (2), 1997, 17–32.
- "Grimm's Fairy Tales and Witches: From the Perspective of Witch-Hunting", The Bulletin of KWANSEI GAKUIN UNIVERSITY (36), 1996, 91–104.
- "Grimmsche Märchen und das Patriarchat der Meiji-Zeit (Grimm Fairy Tales and the Patriarchy of the Meiji Period)", Journal of Women's Studies Association of Mukogawa Women's University (1), 1996, 21–30.
- "Das Frauenbild im Märchen der Brüder Grimm (The image of Women in the Brothers Grimm's fairy tale)", Protokoll Nr.13, 1996.
- "Volksmärchen und Kunstmärchen (Folk Tales and Literary Fairy Tales)", Die Deutsche Lietratur (67), 1981, 83 -92.
- "Rezeption der Kinder- und Hausmärchen der Brüder Grimm in Japan (Reception of the Children's and House Fairy Tales by the Brothers Grimm in Japan)", Diss. Marburg 1977.

== Awards and honors ==
- She commended as an excellent Judge according to grants-in-aid for scientific research-screening. Japan Society for the Promotion of Sciences, 2014.
