= No Rain, No Flowers =

Studio album by the Black Keys
- Released: August 8, 2025
- Studios: Easy Eye (Nashville, Tennessee)
- Genres: Blues rock; garage rock
- Length: 36:50
- Labels: Easy Eye Sound; Warner
- Producer: The Black Keys

The Black Keys chronology
| Ohio Players (2024) | No Rain, No Flowers (2025) | Peaches! (2026) |

Singles from No Rain, No Flowers
- 1. "The Night Before" Released: February 7, 2025; 2. "Babygirl" Released: March 23, 2025; 3. "No Rain, No Flowers" Released: May 16, 2025; 4. "Man on a Mission" Released: June 20, 2025; 5. "On Repeat" Released: July 19, 2025

No Rain, No Flowers is the thirteenth studio album by the American rock duo the Black Keys, released through Easy Eye Sound and Warner Records on August 8, 2025.

== Background ==
In 2024, the Black Keys fired their management, "We got fucked. I'll let you all know how so it doesn't happen to you." wrote the duo's drummer Patrick Carney in a now deleted tweet to his social media. No Rain, No Flowers is the first Black Keys album to include songwriter/producer Rick Nowels. It also includes Daniel Tashian and Scott Storch. The duo wanted to work with long admired songwriters rather than lesser known musicians. When talking about the album's production work, Carney stated: "We wanted to go straight to the source – into the room with people known for their songwriting. Daniel Tashian was one of the first people I met after moving to Nashville, and we've been fans of Scott Storch forever" The duo recorded the entire album at Easy Eye Sound Studio in Nashville, Tennessee.

== Release and promotion ==
No Rain, No Flowers was released on August 8, 2025, through Easy Eye Sound and Warner. Five singles have preceded the album as of July 25, 2025: "The Night Before", "Babygirl", "No Rain, No Flowers", "Man on a Mission", and "On Repeat". The duo is currently on the No Rain, No Flowers Tour, a tour to promote the album.

== Critical reception ==
Professional ratings
Aggregate scores
| Source | Rating |
|---|---|
| AnyDecentMusic? | 6.6/10 |
| Metacritic | 71/100 |
Review scores
| Source | Rating |
| AllMusic | 3.5/5 stars |
| The Arts Desk | 3/5 stars |
| Clash | 7/10 |
| DIY | 3.5/5 stars |
| The Independent | 3/5 stars |
| Mojo | 4/5 stars |
| MusicOMH | 2.5/5 stars |
| Pitchfork | 5.4/10 |
| Rolling Stone | 3.5/5 stars |
| The Skinny | 4/5 stars |
| Sputnikmusic | 3.5/5 |

AllMusic critic Neil Z. Yeung states the duo "keep it close to their existing blues-rock sound, with the producers simply adding a little shine here and there", and notes that "their established nostalgic aesthetic washes over everything, providing familiar moments that connect No Rain, No Flowers to similar-sounding tracks throughout their catalog. There aren't many surprises here, for better or worse, and it's a pleasant, straightforward collection of reliably rocking jams". In his review for the Arts Desk, Tom Carr states the album has "more of a groove", noting an "unshakeable feeling of Auerbach and Carney remaining somewhat in flux", ending that "There is still potential for an unmistakable classic from The Black Keys somewhere in there, but the easy listening rock of No Rain, No Flowers isn't quite it".

Writing for Pitchfork, critic Stephen Thomas Erlewine wrote that he finds the duo "shaking off complacency and venturing into new territory, leaving their gnarled blues-punk back in the garage", noting the album "glides along amiably".

== Track listing ==
All tracks are written by Dan Auerbach and Patrick Carney, with additional writers noted.

No Rain, No Flowers track listing
| No. | Title | Writer(s) | Length |
|---|---|---|---|
| 1. | "No Rain, No Flowers" | Rick Nowels | 3:16 |
| 2. | "The Night Before" | Daniel Tashian | 2:34 |
| 3. | "Babygirl" | Scott Storch; Tashian | 2:54 |
| 4. | "Down to Nothing" | Tommy Brenneck; Pat McLaughlin; Leon Michels | 3:37 |
| 5. | "On Repeat" | Nowels | 3:18 |
| 6. | "Make You Mine" | Desmond Child; Storch | 3:41 |
| 7. | "Man on a Mission" | Tashian | 3:31 |
| 8. | "Kiss It" | Nowels | 3:05 |
| 9. | "All My Life" | Tashian | 2:53 |
| 10. | "A Little Too High" | Brenneck; McLaughlin; Michels | 3:37 |
| 11. | "Neon Moon" | Brenneck; Michels; Tashian | 4:24 |

== Personnel ==
Credits adapted from Tidal.

=== The Black Keys ===
- Dan Auerbach – lead vocals, guitar, production (all tracks); claps (tracks 1, 4, 5, 8–11), bass (2, 3, 8); drum machine, drums (5, 6, 8, 9); kazoo (5, 7, 9), bass synthesizer (7); bass drums, glockenspiel, shaker, tambourine (8)
- Patrick Carney – drums, production (all tracks); cymbals (1), stick percussion (1), guitar (2, 6), percussion (3), tambourine (4–7, 11), cowbell (7), shaker (6, 7), synthesizer (9)

=== Additional musicians ===
- Sam Bacco – tambourine (1, 2, 5, 6, 8, 9, 11), shaker (1, 4, 5, 9–11), bongo drums (1, 9), cymbals (1, 8–11), woodblock (1), cowbell (2, 5, 10), percussion (3), chimes (4, 5), congas (4–6, 8–10), timbales (5, 10), maracas (5), wind chimes (6, 8, 9), güiro (8); bass drums, claves (9)
- Andy Gabbard – background vocals (1, 3–5, 7, 8, 10, 11), guitar (7)
- David Levita – guitar (1, 3, 5–9)
- Tom Bukovac – guitar (1, 3, 5, 6, 10, 11), piano (1), Rhodes piano (5)
- Rick Nowels – Wurlitzer (1, 5, 8); acoustic guitar, horn, Juno synthesizer, Mellotron, organ, strings, synthesizer (1); piano (5, 8)
- Via Mardot – theremin (1)
- Daniel Tashian – background vocals (2, 3, 7, 9, 11), Mellotron (2, 3, 11), bass (2, 7, 9); organ, piano (2, 9); congas, shaker, woodblock (2); guitar, vocoder (11)
- Scott Storch – bass synthesizer, organ, piano (3, 6); clavinet (3), clavichord (6)
- Jake Botts – saxophone (3); alto saxophone, baritone saxophone (9)
- Ray Mason – trombone (3, 9)
- Ashley Wilcoxson – background vocals (4–6, 9), claps (4, 9)
- Leisa Hans – background vocals (4–6, 9), claps (4, 9)
- Leon Michels – bass synthesizer (4, 9), tambourine (4, 10); Moog, organ (4, 11); percussion, piano, synthesizer (10)
- Tommy Brenneck – acoustic guitar, bass (4, 10, 11); guitar (4, 11)
- Nicole "Lady" Wray – background vocals (4)
- Pat McLaughlin – background vocals (4)
- Mike Rojas – bass synthesizer (5, 8, 9); clavichord, glockenspiel, organ, vibraphone (9)
- Zac Rae – Mellotron (5, 8), organistrum (5), organ (8)
- Austin Corona – bass (5)
- Desmond Child – background vocals (6)
- Mireya Ramos – background vocals (6)
- Shae Fiol – background vocals (6)
- Glenn Fishbach – cello (6)
- Larry Gold – strings arrangement (6)
- Jonathan Kim – viola (6)
- Steven Heitlinger – viola (6)
- Blake Espy – violin (6)
- Emma Kummrow – violin (6)
- Gared Crawford – violin (6)
- Luigi Mazzocchi – violin (6)
- Natasha Colkett – violin (6)
- Tess Varley – violin (6)

=== Technical ===
- Rick Nowels – production (1, 5, 8)
- Dean Reid – mixing (1), additional engineering (1, 4–11)
- Manny Marroquin – mixing (2–11)
- Ryan Smith – mastering
- M. Allen Parker – engineering
- Dom Tenaglia – additional engineering (1, 4–11)
- John Christopher Fee – additional engineering (1, 4–11)
- Josh Ditty – additional engineering (1, 2, 4–11)
- Aidan Thillmann – mixing assistance (1)
- Ramiro Fernandez-Seoane – mixing assistance (4–11)
- Trey Station – mixing assistance (4–11)
- Henry Bright – engineering assistance (1, 4–11)
- Jonny Ullman – engineering assistance
- Tyler Zwiep – engineering assistance
- Henry Bright – engineering assistance (3)
- Matt Ciccini – additional strings engineering (6)

== Charts ==
=== Weekly charts ===
Weekly chart performance for No Rain, No Flowers
| Chart (2025) | Peak position |
|---|---|
| Austrian Albums (Ö3 Austria) | 19 |
| Belgian Albums (Ultratop Flanders) | 31 |
| Belgian Albums (Ultratop Wallonia) | 21 |
| Croatian International Albums (HDU) | 1 |
| Dutch Albums (Album Top 100) | 21 |
| French Albums (SNEP) | 35 |
| German Albums (Offizielle Top 100) | 11 |
| Hungarian Albums (MAHASZ) | 6 |
| Japanese Western Albums (Oricon) | 25 |
| Polish Albums (ZPAV) | 90 |
| Portuguese Albums (AFP) | 152 |
| Scottish Albums (Official Charts) | 9 |
| Spanish Albums (Promusicae) | 66 |
| Swiss Albums (Schweizer Hitparade) | 5 |
| UK Albums (Official Charts) | 47 |
| UK Americana Albums (Official Charts) | 9 |
| US Billboard 200 | 52 |
| US Top Rock & Alternative Albums (Billboard) | 11 |

=== Year-end charts ===
Year-end chart performance for No Rain, No Flowers
| Chart (2025) | Position |
|---|---|
| Croatian International Albums (HDU) | 6 |
