= Sal Cuevas =

Puerto Rican Latin jazz & Salsa musician

Salvador "Sal" Cuevas

Background information
- Born: June 16, 1955; Manhattan, New York, U.S.
- Died: April 9, 2017 (aged 61) Miami, Florida, U.S.
- Genres: Afro-Cuban jazz; salsa; son cubano; boogaloo; pachanga; funk
- Occupation: Musician
- Instruments: Bass; electric bass
- Years active: 1968–2017
- Labels: Tico; Fania; Columbia
- Formerly of: Fania All-Stars; Los Kimbos

Salvador "Sal" Cuevas (June 16, 1955 – April 9, 2017) was an American salsa bassist known for his association with the Fania All-Stars from 1978 to 1985.

Although he played the upright bass, he was one of the most popular electric bassists in the New York salsa scene, often playing in a funk style. "He was the first to bring the slaps and funk style that he learned from R&B, Funk, and Jazz music, into Salsa music." According to Billy Idol, Sal Cuevas came up with the bass for “Eyes Without a Face” when Billy was looking for a sound that was powerful enough to complement the dark unromantic lyrics.

== Early life ==
Cuevas was born in Manhattan in 1955 and raised in The Bronx by Puerto Rican parents. Aged five his father began teaching him to play chords on the guitar. The demographics of the city during the time provided Cuevas with an array of musical influences which he absorbed and later incorporated into his bass playing technique and style. At age 12 he played with his trio on Myrta Silva's show Una Hora Contigo (An Hour with You).

He explained in an interview, “Being from New York you are exposed to not only the Latin part of music, you are also exposed to Rhythm and Blues, Punk, and also Jazz, so I started playing all of that stuff when I went to Junior High school. I spoke to my teacher and he said ‘why don’t you play the bass?' He doesn't know how right he was."

For his high school years he attended the High School of Music & Art. At age 17, he began performing with Tony Pabon y La Protesta. After graduating high school he entered Mannes School of Music and left in his first semester when he was hired by Mongo Santamaria to join his world tour.

== Career ==
Cuevas was a member of various notable salsa ensembles, including Los Kimbos, the Fania All-Stars and those of Johnny Pacheco, Héctor Lavoe and Willie Colón. During this time, he was also one of five bass players in New York City who recorded many of the "Jingles" for TV and radio; the others were Marcus Miller, Will Lee, Francisco Centeno and Neil Jason. Cuevas performed and recorded with many salsa artists in New York for decades, before moving to Miami in his later years. While performing and recording, Cuevas worked as a New York City Corrections Officer, New York City Police Officer, Florida State Corrections Officer and ultimately retired as a Florida Police Seargent after he relocated to southern Florida. Cuevas enjoyed the title of musical director to Willie Colón's orchestra both during Willie's collaborations with famed Panamanian singer/songwriter/actor Rubén Blades and Colón's solo singing ventures. He played bass on Billy Idol's hit "Eyes Without a Face" from the 1983 studio album Rebel Yell.

== Style ==
His bass slapping and string snapping technique has become common for bassists within Latin "salsa" music. On the electric upright bass, Cuevas incorporated techniques which also (until then) were rarely heard of in Latin music such as slides (glissandi), and utilizing the very upper ranges of the instrument, as heard on "La ceiba y la siguaraya", recorded with Celia Cruz and La Sonora Ponceña.

Cuevas has performed and recorded with Ray Barretto, Joe Bataan, Willie Colon, Larry Harlow, Monguito, Johnny Pacheco, Louie Ramirez, Ralph Robles, Mongo Santamaria, Tony Pabon, Bobby Valentin, Héctor Lavoe, Adalberto Santiago, Pete "El Conde" Rodríguez, Ismael Miranda, Ray Maldonado, Ralph Marzan, Orestes Vilató, Roberto Rodriguez, Jose Rodriguez, and Barry Rogers, Tito Puente, Eddie Palmieri, Ricardo Ray, Jimmy Sabater, Celia Cruz, Machito, Ismael Miranda, Ismael Quintana, Cheo Feliciano, Tito Nieves, La India, Mongo Sanatamaria, Gloria Estefan, The Manhattans, Angela Bofil, Mandy More, Soledad Bravo, Jose Feliciano, Jon Lucien, Los Gaitanes, Billy Idol, Lenny Kravitz, Black Eyed Peas, Usher, Il Volo, Jon Secada, Frank De Vita, Cissy Houston, Kristy MacColl, Harry Belafonte, Ricky Martin, Jennifer Lopez, David Bisbal, Thalia, Los Ilegales, Christian Castro, Oscar Deleon, Eddie Palmieri, Charlie Palmieri, Hector El Father, Obie Bermudez, Ricardo Montaner, Don Omar, Tego Calderon, Marc Anthony, Fernando Villalona, Papo Luca, Dave Valentin, Noel Pointer, Isaac Delgado,Wilfrido Vargas,Victor Manuel, Gilberto Santa Rosa,Olga Tañon, Carlos Vives, Jlo, Oscar De Leon, Elvis Crespo, Giselle,Carlos Ponce, Nestor Torres, Airto & Flora Purim.

== Death ==
Cuevas died on May 9, 2017, at Memorial Hospital Pembroke Pines Memorial Hospital. He had complications from diabetes and in previous days suffered a massive stroke and was left in a induced coma.

== See also ==
- Salsa
- Charanga (Cuba)
- Afro-Cuban jazz
- Funk
