= Ohio Players (album) =

2024 album by The Black Keys

Studio album by the Black Keys
- Released: April 5, 2024
- Studio: Easy Eye (Nashville, Tennessee)
- Genre: Garage rock; blues rock
- Length: 43:35
- Label: Easy Eye Sound; Nonesuch
- Producer: The Black Keys; Dan the Automator

The Black Keys chronology
Dropout Boogie (2022)	Ohio Players (2024)	No Rain, No Flowers (2025)

Singles from Ohio Players
- 1. "Beautiful People (Stay High)" Released: January 12, 2024; 2. "I Forgot to Be Your Lover" Released: February 9, 2024; 3. "This Is Nowhere" Released: March 8, 2024

Ohio Players is the twelfth studio album by American rock duo the Black Keys. It was released on April 5, 2024, by Easy Eye Sound and Nonesuch Records. It was preceded by lead single "Beautiful People (Stay High)" on January 12, 2024, and the second single "I Forgot to Be Your Lover", a cover of William Bell's 1968 song of the same title. "Beautiful People (Stay High)" received nominations for Best Rock Performance and Best Rock Song at the 67th Annual Grammy Awards.

A deluxe version of the album, subtitled "Trophy Edition", was released on November 15, 2024. It has a different track order and contains four new songs each with new guest appearances: "Mi Tormenta" with DannyLux, "I'm with the Band" and "Sin City" with Beck and "Stay in Your Grave" with Alice Cooper.

== Critical reception ==
Professional ratings
Aggregate scores
Source	Rating
Metacritic	76/100
Review scores
Source	Rating
The Guardian	3/5 stars
NME	3/5 stars
Pitchfork	7.2/10
Rolling Stone	4/5 stars
Slant Magazine	2.5/5 stars

The album currently has a Metacritic score of 76, indicating "generally favorable" reviews. Rolling Stone stated the presence of guest musicians such as Beck and Noel Gallagher made Ohio Players "one of their best LPs". Several reviews positively noted the Black Keys' ability to reinvent their sound while remaining in touch with their garage rock and blues roots. A positive review from Pitchfork called the album "lively, fresh and colorful." A mixed review from Slant Magazine felt the guest musicians caused The Black Keys to be lost in their own album, and criticized the song "Beautiful People (Stay High)" for sounding as if it was AI generated and trying hard to appeal to "lifestyle brands". A mixed review from The Guardian called the album an "underwhelming diffusion of the band's once heady magic." NME in comparison found the album to be too familiar, and stated the album showed how "The Black Keys might have a killer record collection but Ohio Players is the work of a band who are perhaps too good at being themselves."

Following the album's release marking the first Black Keys album not to crack the Billboard Top 20 in 18 years and the sudden cancelation of the band's North American tour, Pitchfork contributor Stephen Thomas Erlewine restated his positive view of the album from his prior review but noted 2024 marked a year where a shift in cultural tastes had seemed to abandon the Black Keys. Erlewine reiterated his positive opinion on the band's attempt to reinvent their sound on Ohio Players.

== Track listing ==
=== Original version ===
No.	Title	Writer(s)	Length
1.	"This Is Nowhere"	Dan Auerbach; Patrick Carney; Beck Hansen	3:44
2.	"Don't Let Me Go"	Auerbach; Carney; Gary Crockett; Dominic Glover; Jason Glover; Hansen; Daniel Nakamura	2:34
3.	"Beautiful People (Stay High)"	Auerbach; Carney; Hansen; Richard Mead; Nakamura	2:47
4.	"On the Game"	Auerbach; Carney; Noel Gallagher; Leon Michels	4:02
5.	"Only Love Matters"	Auerbach; Carney; Gallagher; Michels	3:22
6.	"Candy and Her Friends" (featuring Lil Noid)	Auerbach; Carney	3:25
7.	"I Forgot to Be Your Lover"	William Bell; Booker T. Jones	2:27
8.	"Please Me (Till I'm Satisfied)"	Auerbach; Carney; Greg Cartwright	2:44
9.	"You'll Pay"	Auerbach; Michels; Gallagher; Carney	2:45
10.	"Paper Crown" (featuring Beck and Juicy J)	Auerbach; Carney; Hansen; Houston III	4:17
11.	"Live Till I Die"	Auerbach; Carney; Hansen	2:23
12.	"Read Em and Weep"	Auerbach; Carney; Cartwright	3:23
13.	"Fever Tree"	Auerbach; Carney; Hansen	3:05
14.	"Every Time You Leave"	Auerbach; Carney; Hansen; Greg Kurstin	2:57
Total length:			43:35

=== Deluxe "Trophy Edition" versions ===
Standard Trophy Edition
No.	Title	Writer(s)	Length
1.	"This Is Nowhere"	Auerbach; Carney; Hansen	3:44
2.	"Don't Let Me Go"	Auerbach; Carney; Gary Crockett; Dominic Glover; Jason Glover; Hansen; Daniel Nakamura	2:34
3.	"Beautiful People (Stay High)"	Auerbach; Carney; Hansen; Richard Mead; Nakamura	2:47
4.	"On the Game"	Auerbach; Carney; Noel Gallagher; Leon Michels	4:02
5.	"Sin City"	Hansen; Auerbach; Greg Kurstin; Carney	2:42
6.	"Candy and Her Friends" (featuring Lil Noid)	Auerbach; Carney	3:25
7.	"Read Em and Weep"	Auerbach; Carney; Cartwright	3:23
8.	"I Forgot to Be Your Lover"	William Bell; Booker T. Jones	2:27
9.	"Only Love Matters"	Auerbach; Carney; Gallagher; Michels	3:22
10.	"Every Time You Leave"	Auerbach; Carney; Hansen; Kurstin	2:57
11.	"Mi Tormenta" (featuring DannyLux)	DannyLux; Hansen; Auerbach; Carney	3:22
12.	"You'll Pay"	Auerbach; Michels; Gallagher; Carney	2:45
13.	"Paper Crown" (featuring Beck and Juicy J)	Auerbach; Carney; Hansen; Houston III	4:17
14.	"Live Till I Die"	Auerbach; Carney; Hansen	2:23
15.	"Stay in Your Grave" (featuring Alice Cooper)	Auerbach; Carney; Cartwright; Sky Stone	2:19
16.	"Please Me (Till I'm Satisfied)"	Auerbach; Carney; Greg Cartwright	2:44
17.	"Fever Tree"	Hansen; Auerbach; Carney	3:05
18.	"I'm with the Band" (featuring Beck)	Hansen; Auerbach; Carney	2:55
Total length:			54:53

Amazon Exclusive Trophy Edition bonus track
No.	Title	Writer(s)	Length
19.	"Let Love Take Its Time"	Auerbach; Carney	3:08
Total length:			58:01

Note

- "I Forgot to Be Your Lover" is a cover of the song of the same name, written by William Bell and Booker T. Jones and performed by Bell.

== Personnel ==
The Black Keys

- Dan Auerbach – lead vocals, bass, electric guitar, production (all tracks); Moog (tracks 6, 8, 10); claps, drum machine (6, 10); Mellotron, shaker (6); Hammond organ (9), vocoder (10)
- Patrick Carney – claps, drum machine, drums, production (all tracks); electric guitar (tracks 1, 3, 4, 9, 14), tambourine (1, 5, 9, 12), Moog (1, 6, 9, 10, 13), Mellotron (2, 5), shaker (5, 9, 12), cowbell (5, 9), synthesizer (12)

Additional musicians

- Andy Gabbard – backing vocals (tracks 1–6, 8, 10, 13), electric guitar (13)
- Beck – backing vocals (tracks 1–3, 11, 13), celeste keyboards (3), organ (10, 12), electric guitar (10), synthesizer (12), acoustic guitar (13)
- Sam Bacco – shaker (tracks 1–3, 7, 9–11, 13), tambourine (1, 2, 5–7, 9, 10, 13), cowbell (1, 2, 8, 11, 13), cymbals (1, 7, 8), congas (2, 3, 5, 7, 8, 11), additional percussion (2, 9), bongo drums (3, 9), bells (3), woodblock (5), chimes (6), wind chimes (7, 13), gongs (13)
- Tom Bukovac – electric guitar (tracks 1–6, 8, 9, 11, 14), acoustic guitar (2)
- Ray Jacildo – piano (tracks 1–3, 5, 11), Hammond organ (1, 2); glockenspiel, Moog, organ, vibraphone, Wurlitzer organ (2); Wurlitzer piano (3), harpsichord (6)
- Mike Rojas – piano (tracks 1, 3–5, 7, 9, 11); Mellotron, Moog (1); strings (2); vibraphone, Wurlitzer (9)
- Jake Botts – baritone saxophone, tenor saxophone (tracks 2, 3)
- Ray Mason – trombone (tracks 2, 3), trumpet (2)
- Ashley Wilcoxson – backing vocals (tracks 3–5, 10, 11, 13, 14)
- Leisa Hans – backing vocals (tracks 3–5, 10, 11, 13, 14)
- Zach Gabbard – backing vocals (tracks 3, 8, 12), claps (3)
- Chris St. Hilaire – claps (track 3), backing vocals (8, 12)
- Dan the Automator – samples (track 3)
- Noel Gallagher – backing vocals (tracks 4, 5, 9), electric guitar (4)
- Leon Michels – electric guitar (tracks 4, 5, 9), organ (4, 5, 12); baritone saxophone, tenor saxophone (5, 9, 12); glockenspiel, Mellotron (5); Hammond organ, marimba, piano (9)
- Trey Keller – backing vocals (track 5)
- Angelo Petraglia – electric guitar (track 6)
- Kelly Finnegan – backing vocals, Hammond organ (track 7)
- Tommy Brenneck – baritone guitar, electric guitar (track 7)
- Matt Combs – strings (track 7)
- Aaron Frazer – backing vocals (track 10)
- Greg Kurstin – backing vocals, electric guitar, keyboards, percussion, synthesizer (track 14)

Technical

- Dan the Automator – production (tracks 2, 3)
- Greg Kurstin – production (track 14)
- Howie Weinberg – mastering
- Will Borza – mastering
- Mark "Spike" Stent – mixing
- M. Allen Parker – engineering
- Liam Watson – engineering (tracks 4, 5, 9)
- Greg Kurstin – engineering (track 14)
- Julian Burg – engineering (track 14)
- Matt Tuggle – engineering (track 14)
- Caleb VanBuskirk – additional engineering
- Trey Keller – additional engineering (tracks 4, 5, 9)
- Michael Foster – additional engineering (track 10)
- Matt Wolach – mixing assistance
- Jonny Ullman – engineering assistance
- McKinley James – engineering assistance
- Andy Petr – engineering assistance (tracks 1, 5, 7, 12, 14)
- Franky Fox – engineering assistance (tracks 1, 5, 7, 12, 14)
- Travis Pavur – engineering assistance (tracks 1, 5, 7, 12, 14)
- Tyler Zwiep – engineering assistance (tracks 1, 5, 7, 12, 14)

== Charts ==
Chart performance for Ohio Players
Chart (2024)	Peak position
Australian Albums (ARIA)	68
Austrian Albums (Ö3 Austria)	5
Belgian Albums (Ultratop Flanders)	13
Belgian Albums (Ultratop Wallonia)	11
Canadian Albums (Billboard)	35
Croatian International Albums (HDU)	3
Dutch Albums (Album Top 100)	10
French Albums (SNEP)	15
German Albums (Offizielle Top 100)	3
Hungarian Albums (MAHASZ)	9
Irish Albums (OCC)	43
Italian Albums (FIMI)	45
Japanese Hot Albums (Billboard Japan)	95
New Zealand Albums (RMNZ)	18
Polish Albums (ZPAV)	74
Portuguese Albums (AFP)	21
Scottish Albums (OCC)	6
Spanish Albums (Promusicae)	23
Swiss Albums (Schweizer Hitparade)	2
UK Albums (OCC)	13
US Billboard 200	26
US Top Rock & Alternative Albums (Billboard)	7
