= Soul Standing By =

Single by Billy Idol

from the album Whiplash Smile
- B-side: "Worlds Forgotten Boy"
- Released: August 1987
- Label: Festival, Chrysalis
- Songwriter: Billy Idol
- Producer: Keith Forsey

Billy Idol singles chronology
"Sweet Sixteen" (1987)	"Soul Standing By" (1987)	"Mony Mony" (1987)

"Soul Standing By" is a song by the English rock singer Billy Idol, released in 1987 as the fourth and final single from his third studio album, Whiplash Smile (1986). It was released only in Australia and New Zealand, becoming a top 20 hit in the latter.

== Personnel ==
Credits adapted from Whiplash Smile liner notes.

- Billy Idol – vocals, guitars, bass
- Steve Stevens – guitars, keyboards, programming, bass
- Phillip Ashley – keyboards
- Harold Faltermeyer – keyboards
- David Frank – keyboards
- Richard Tee – keyboards
- Marcus Miller – bass
- John Regan – bass
- Keith Forsey – producer

== Charts ==
Chart (1987)	Peak position
New Zealand (Recorded Music NZ)	20
