= Eugene Revitch =

American psychologist

- Born: August 6, 1909
- Died: September 14, 1996 (aged 87)

Academic background
- Education: University of Paris

Academic work
- Discipline: psychiatry
- Institutions: Robert Wood Johnson Medical School
- Main interests: criminal behavior

Eugene Revitch (August 6, 1909 – September 14, 1996) was a Latvian professor and psychiatrist known for his work on the psychiatric aspects of criminal behavior. He was a clinical professor of psychiatry at the Robert Wood Johnson Medical School.

Revitch was born in Riga, Latvia. He attended the University of Montpellier in France, and graduated from the University of Paris Medical School in 1936. He received his psychiatry and neurology training in the United States and served in the United States Army during World War II, evaluating and treating military prisoners at Fort Missoula, Montana. He became a captain in the United States Army Medical Corps.

During his 22-year affiliation with the New Jersey Diagnostic Center (the state's forensic facility), Revitch published some of the first papers on sexual aggression and sexual murder.
