= Journal of Baltic Studies =

Journal focused on the topics of Baltic region

- Discipline: Baltic Studies
- Language: English

Publication details
- History: 1970 - present
- Publisher: Routledge
- Frequency: Quarterly

Standard abbreviations
- ISO 4: J. Balt. Stud.

Indexing
- ISSN: 1751-7877

The Journal of Baltic Studies, the official journal of the Association for the Advancement of Baltic Studies (AABS), is a peer-reviewed multidisciplinary academic journal founded in 1970 and published quarterly by Routledge. It is dedicated to the political, social, economic, and cultural life of the Baltic region and its history. Its current editor is Matthew Kott, a historian and researcher at the Institute of Russian and Eurasian Studies at Uppsala University.
