= Rasma Kārkliņa =

Latvian political scientist

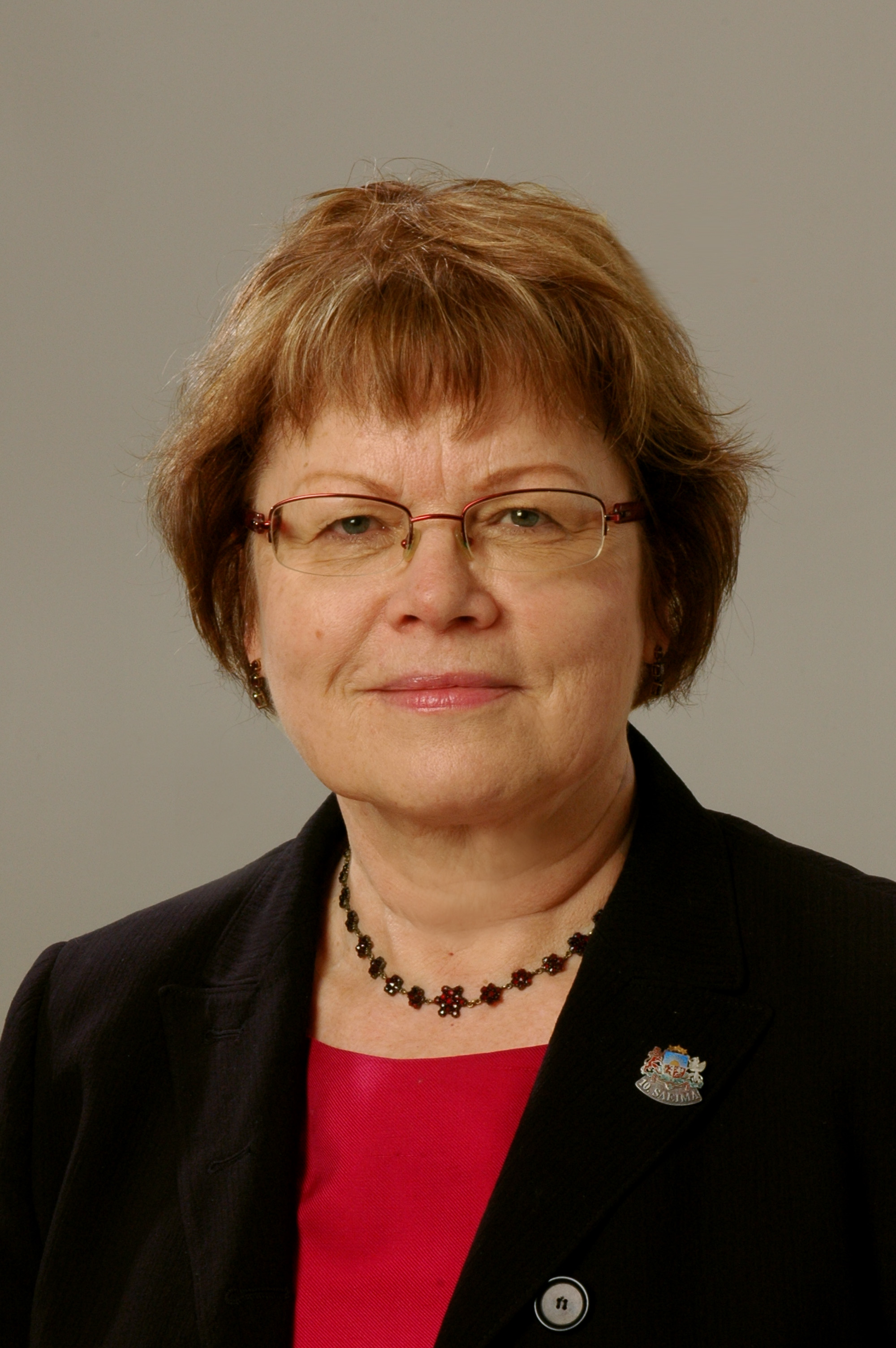
- Born: Marburg, Germany
- Education: Free University of Berlin; University of Chicago
- Scientific career
- Fields: Political science
- Workplaces: University of Illinois at Chicago; Institute for Advanced Study; University of Latvia

Rasma Kārkliņa (born Rasma Šilde, often written Karklins) is a Latvian and American political scientist and politician. She worked as a professor of political science both in the United States and in Latvia. For two terms she was the Chair of the Department of Political Science at the University of Illinois at Chicago, where she was also Associate Dean of the College of Liberal Arts and Sciences. In 2010 she won a seat in the Saeima, affiliated with the New Unity party.

== Education ==
Kārkliņa grew up in Germany, where her father Ādolfs Šilde was a diplomatic representative of Latvia. She attended the Free University of Berlin, where she graduated with a political science degree in 1969. She then moved to the United States and studied political science at the University of Chicago, earning an MA in international relations in 1971 and a PhD in political science in 1975.

== Career ==
=== Academia ===
After obtaining her PhD from The University of Chicago, Kārkliņa became a professor of political science at Boston University. In 1980 she joined the political science faculty at the University of Illinois at Chicago, where she worked until 2008, and became professor emerita. She served two terms as Chair of the Department of Political Science at the University of Illinois at Chicago: the first from 1994 to 1996, and the second from 1999 to 2001. From 2002 to 2003, she was a visiting fellow at the Institute for Advanced Study. In 2003 and 2004, she was Associate Dean of the College of Liberal Arts and Sciences at the University of Illinois at Chicago. In the 1993–1994 school year, Kārkliņa was a Fulbright Visiting professor at The University of Latvia. Beginning in 2006 Kārkliņa was again a visiting professor at The University of Latvia, where in 2010 she oversaw research endowed by the European Social Fund. From 2003 to 2009, she was a member of the Council of Professors of the Faculty of Social Sciences of the University of Latvia.

In her research as an academic political scientist, Kārkliņa specializes in Baltic studies, democratization particularly in Eastern European countries, and democracy and civil society in Latvia. Kārkliņa wrote several books. In 1986, she published Ethnic Relations in the USSR: The Perspective from Below, which was published in another edition in 1988. In 1994, she wrote the book Ethnic Politics and Transition to Democracy: The Collapse of the USSR and Latvia. And In 2005, she published The System Made Me Do It: Corruption in the Post-communist Region, which in 2006 was translated into Latvian.

=== Politics ===
In 2009, Kārkliņa was appointed an advisor to Imants Lieģis, the Latvian Minister of Defence.

In 2010, Kārkliņa joined the party list of the Civic Union party, and in 2010 she was elected to the 10th Latvian parliament (lv) in the New Unity party coalition. She served in the Latvian parliament for the duration of the 10th Saeima, and was also appointed to serve in the 11th Saeima during 2011.
