= To Be a Lover =

1968 single by William Bell

"To Be a Lover" is a song written by William Bell and Booker T. Jones, and originally performed by Bell as a soul ballad titled "I Forgot to Be Your Lover". It was released in late 1968, hitting No. 45 on the Billboard Hot 100 and No. 10 on the Hot Rhythm & Blues Singles chart in early 1969. Best known as a cover by Billy Idol, it was released in 1986 as the lead single from his third studio album Whiplash Smile, becoming his second top ten hit in the US, peaking at No. 6 on the Billboard Hot 100 and No. 22 on the UK Singles Chart.

== William Bell version ==
"I Forgot to Be Your Lover"

Single by William Bell
- B-side: "Bring the Curtain Down"
- Released: November 1968
- Recorded: 1968
- Genre: Southern soul
- Length: 2:19
- Label: Stax
- Songwriters: William Bell; Booker Jones
- Producer: Booker T. Jones

William Bell singles chronology
"Private Number" (1968)	"I Forgot to Be Your Lover" (1968)	"My Baby Specializes" (1968)

"I Forgot to Be Your Lover" is a slow, southern soul ballad, also described as deep soul and R&B, written by William Bell and his high school friend Booker T. Jones. Lyrically, it starts by him asking an unnamed partner, "have I told you lately that I love you?" This isn't the case, as he spends the rest of the song pleading for forgiveness and pledging devotion.

=== Release ===
The single, released by Stax in November 1968, was backed by "Bring the Curtain Down", another song he wrote with Jones. The single was also Bell's first top ten hit on the Hot Rhythm & Blues Singles chart in early 1969, and reached No. 45 on the Billboard Hot 100. Both songs were rereleased on his second studio album, Bound to Happen (1969), in the wake of the single's success.

=== Track listing ===
All tracks are written by William Bell and Booker. T Jones.

No.	Title	Length
1.	"I Forgot to Be Your Lover"	2:19
2.	"Bring the Curtain Down"	2:27
Total length:		4:46

=== Personnel ===
Credits adapted from AllMusic review.

- William Bell – vocals
- Steve Cropper – guitars
- Al Jackson – drumming
- Booker. T Jones - production

=== Charts ===
Chart (1968–1969)	Peak position
US Billboard Hot 100	45
US Hot Rhythm & Blues Singles (Billboard)	10

== Other soul versions ==
An orchestral cover by vocal group the Mad Lads was included on their third studio album A New Beginning (1973), also released by Stax/Volt. Organist and producer Al Kooper covered the song in slow speak-singing form on his tenth studio album Act Like Nothing's Wrong (1976). Veteran soul singer Tommy Tate released a cover on his third studio album Love Me Now (1990), one of the closest to Bell's original. Blues versions of "I Forgot To Be Your Lover" were released by guitarist and singer Robert Cray on his 16th studio album Twenty (2005), and rock duo the Black Keys on their 12th studio album Ohio Players (2024). Singer-songwriter Bruce Springsteen recorded the song for his 21st studio album Only the Strong Survive (2022), and followed Bell’s tempo and string arrangement. R&B singer Jaheim sampled the song on "Put That Woman First", a hit single from his second studio album Still Ghetto (2002).

== Reggae versions ==
In 1971, Lee "Scratch" Perry produced an early reggae version of the song, performed in an uptempo style by Shenley Duffus with Perry's studio band, the Upsetters, with the title shortened to "To Be a Lover". It was Duffus' final recording and a comeback single after the underperformance of his previous three, "At the End," "Goodnight My Love," and "Sincerely". The song became his most popular 45 RPM vinyl record and Perry's biggest hit of the year.

In 1977, Perry again produced the song, this time for Earl George Turner. This version, also called simply "To Be a Lover", (Note: The song was titled "To Be a Lover (Have Mercy)" on its album release.) was heavily shaped by Perry's Black Ark sound and effects and featured backing vocals from the Meditations and Mighty Diamonds. His first recording saw little success, but after renaming to George Faith, he released a new version of the song on his debut studio album, Super Eight (1977), which was released as To Be a Lover in the UK. More popular than any of the previous Jamaican versions of the track, it became a hit there and in the UK.

== Billy Idol version ==
"To Be a Lover"

Single by Billy Idol

from the album Whiplash Smile
- B-side: "All Summer Single"
- Released: September 22, 1986
- Recorded: 1986
- Genre: New wave; rockabilly
- Length: 3:52
- Label: Chrysalis
- Songwriters: William Bell; Booker T. Jones
- Producer: Keith Forsey

Billy Idol singles chronology
"Catch My Fall" (1984)	"To Be a Lover" (1986)	"Don't Need a Gun" (1986)

Music video
- "To Be a Lover" on YouTube

In 1986, the track was reworked by the English rock singer Billy Idol, becoming the second high-profile cover version he released as a single, after 1981's "Mony Mony". Idol was introduced to the song by the George Faith reggae version—he initially was unaware of the original William Bell release, and so retained the truncated title "To Be a Lover".

=== Composition ===
Billy Idol more radically transformed the song into an upbeat "dance-rock anthem" with elements of pop, rock and R&B. He adds a soulful rockabilly feel, honky-tonk piano and "Motown-style hot girl chorus". Singers Jocelyn Brown, Connie Harvey and Janet Wright played a key role in giving the song's backing vocals a soulful sound, while Keith Forsey's production adds a funky bassline with punchy rhythm, prominent synths, and rock guitars. uDiscover Music declared his cover an "electro-tinged rockabilly lament supported by gospel backing vocals and N’Awlins-style boogie piano." Vocal Media compared the track to Elvis Presley, stating it is the closest Idol has got to R&B.

=== Release ===
The single was backed by Whiplash Smile album track "All Summer Single". Two different 12-inch singles were released worldwide (one in the UK and one in Australia), featuring the aforementioned track and two extended remixes of "To Be a Lover, the "Mother of Mercy Mix", which is six minutes and 45 seconds, and the "Rock 'n' Roll Mix" in Australia and New Zealand only.

The "Mother of Mercy Mix" is a harder song than the single version, with a prominent heavy guitar riff by Steve Stevens dominating most of the track and an interlude with distorted female groans. This version that is featured on the 1987 US and 1988 Japan editions of the remix compilation album Vital Idol (1985). The UK 12-inch was also released as a limited-edition picture disc. A music video was also released, which was popular on MTV.

=== Critical reception ===
Paul Elliott of Sounds called it "pompous alright, but positively smoking with heat and urgency". He said that, despite it being a cover of a 1960s song, it "nevertheless sounds very '80s and very Idol". Billboard writes that Idol "tackles R&B material and ends up with foot-twitching disco/rockabilly fusion," while retaining his snarly image. Cash Box proclaims it's a "sassy modern reworking" of Bell's original, and a solid rock radio and dance club record that's "full of...bad boy sexiness." Gold Radio ranked the song #7 on their "Billy Idol's top 10 songs" list, calling it a "masterpiece" that removes the reggae elements from George Faith's cover, transforming it into a "seductive, finger-snapping song that would provide the perfect soundtrack for a night-time drive on Los Angeles' highways."

=== Formats and track listings ===
==== 7": Chrysalis – IDOL 8 (UK) ====
No.	Title	Writer(s)	Length
1.	"To Be a Lover"	William Bell, Booker T. Jones	3:50
2.	"All Summer Single"	Billy Idol	4:33

==== 12": Chrysalis – IDOLX 8 (UK) ====
No.	Title	Writer(s)	Length
1.	"To Be a Lover" (Mother of Mercy Mix)	Bell, Jones	6:45
2.	"To Be a Lover"	Bell, Jones	3:50
3.	"All Summer Single"	Idol	4:33

- Also available as a picture disc (IDOLP 8)

==== 12": Festival Records – X 14449 (Australia and New Zealand) ====
No.	Title	Writer(s)	Length
1.	"To Be a Lover" (Rock 'n' Roll Mix)	Bell, Jones	7:11
2.	"To Be a Lover" (Mother of Mercy Mix)	Bell, Jones	6:45
3.	"All Summer Single"	Idol	4:33

=== Personnel ===
Credits adapted from Whiplash Smile liner notes.

- Billy Idol – vocals, guitars, bass
- Steve Stevens – guitars, keyboards, programming, bass
- Phillip Ashley – keyboards
- Harold Faltermeyer – keyboards
- David Frank – keyboards
- Richard Tee – keyboards
- Marcus Miller – bass
- John Regan – bass
- Jocelyn Brown – backing vocals
- Connie Harvey – backing vocals
- Janet Wright – backing vocals
- Keith Forsey – producer

=== Charts ===
==== Weekly charts ====
Weekly chart performance for "To Be a Lover"
Chart (1986–1987)	Peak position
Australia (Kent Music Report)	3
Canadian RPM Top Singles	7
Italy (Musica e Dischi)	18
New Zealand (Recorded Music NZ)	2
US Billboard Hot 100	6

==== Year-end charts ====
1986 year-end chart performance for "To Be a Lover"
Chart (1986)	Position
Australia (Kent Music Report)	79

1987 year-end chart performance for "To Be a Lover"
Chart (1987)	Position
Australia (Kent Music Report)	34
US Top Pop Singles (Billboard)	64

=== Certifications ===
Certifications for "To Be a Lover"
Region	Certification	Certified units/sales
Canada (Music Canada)	Gold	50,000^{^}
^{^} Shipments figures based on certification alone.
