= Baika Women's University =

Coordinates: 34°50′35″N 135°32′7″E

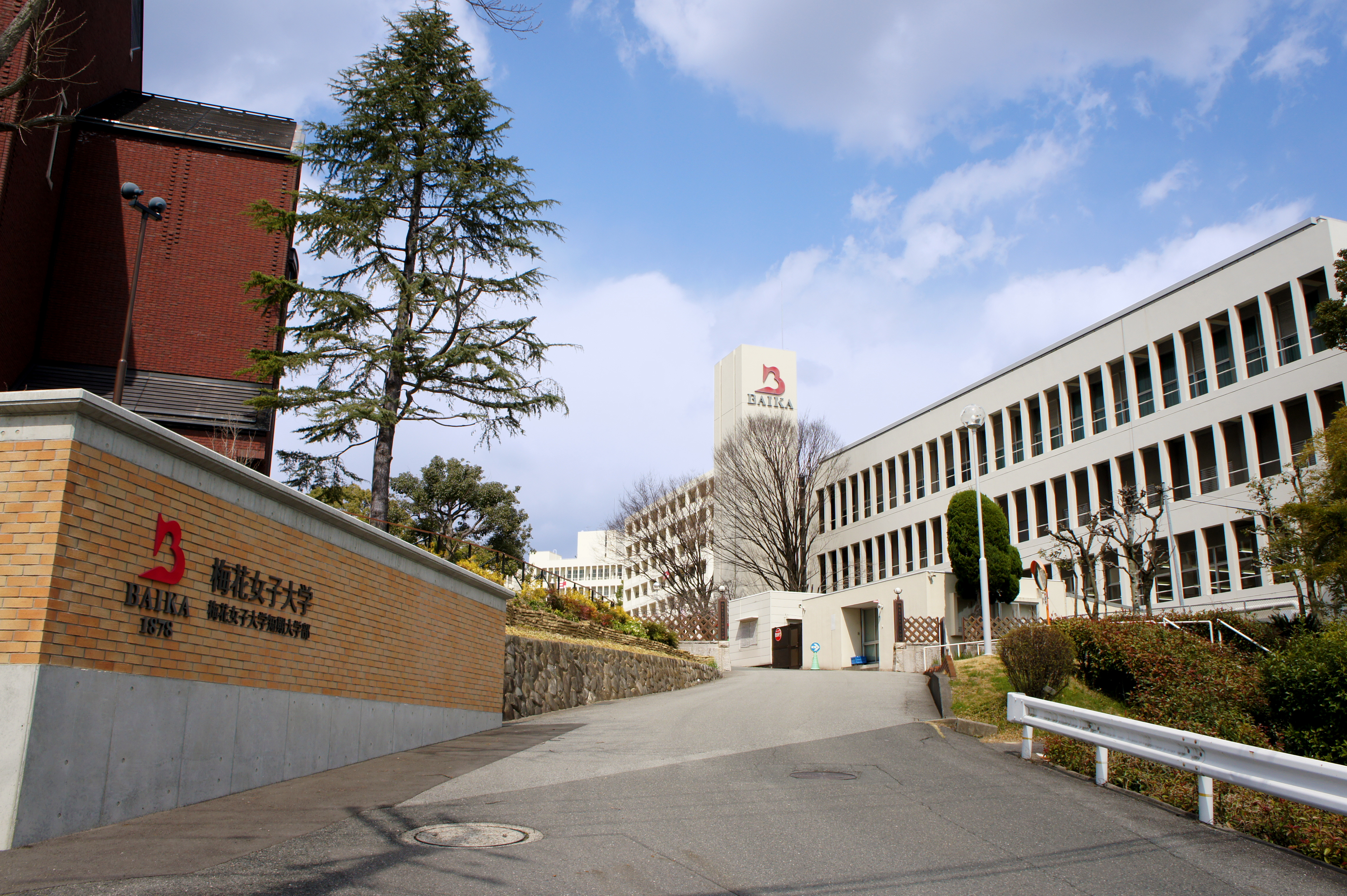
BAIKA Women's University

Baika Women's University (梅花女子大学, Baika joshi daigaku) is a private women's college in Ibaraki, Osaka, Japan. The predecessor of the school was founded in 1878 by educator Poro Sawayama. It was chartered as a junior women's college in 1950 and became a four-year college in 1964.
