= Rebel Yell (album) =

Studio album by Billy Idol
- Released: 10 November 1983
- Recorded: 1983
- Studios: Electric Lady (New York City); RPM (New York City); Mediasound (New York City)
- Genres: New wave; hard rock; synth-pop
- Length: 38:10
- Label: Chrysalis
- Producer: Keith Forsey

Billy Idol chronology
Billy Idol (1982)	Rebel Yell (1983)	Vital Idol (1985)

Singles from Rebel Yell
- 1. "Rebel Yell" Released: January 1984; 2. "Eyes Without a Face" Released: April 1984; 3. "Flesh for Fantasy" Released: August 1984; 4. "Catch My Fall" Released: October 1984

Rebel Yell is the second studio album by the English rock singer Billy Idol, released on 10 November 1983 by Chrysalis Records in the US and on 9 January 1984 in the UK. After the release of his 1982 eponymous debut studio album, Idol continued his collaboration with producer Keith Forsey and multi-instrumentalist Steve Stevens. The album was recorded at Electric Lady Studios in New York. Forsey and Stevens later decided to hire Thommy Price to play drums on some of the songs. The cover sleeve and images were shot by Brian Griffin. Idol got the idea of the album's title after attending a party with the Rolling Stones and drinking Rebel Yell bourbon whiskey.

== Background and recording ==
Rebel Yell reunited the hit-making team of Idol, Steve Stevens, and Keith Forsey after their success with Idol's solo debut, Billy Idol (1982). Idol got the idea to name the album "Rebel Yell" after attending a party with the Rolling Stones. He explained on VH1 Storytellers that people were drinking Rebel Yell bourbon whiskey and he thought that would be a great title for an album.

Working with Forsey and Idol were guitarist Steve Stevens, bassist Phil Feit and later Steve Webster, drummer Gregg Gerson, and keyboardists Judi Dozier and Jack Waldman. In the studio, however, they had difficulty recording with Gerson, so they resorted to recording with only the LinnDrum and Roland TR-808 drum machines for the time being. Drummer Thommy Price was brought in towards the end of the recording sessions, who could play along to the LinnDrum whilst recording.

== Cover art ==
When Rebel Yell was in production, Idol had a disagreement with his record company over the image that would be used on the album cover: he saw it as flawed, but the company refused to change it. In response, Idol decided to steal the master tapes for the album and give them to his drug dealer so that he could blackmail the company, saying, "This guy I've given them to, he'll have them out on the street bootlegged in a couple of days if you don't change this picture." Forsey later recounted that Idol had actually taken the wrong tapes: "I let him think he had the masters ... He did whatever he had to do with the label. Everything was squared away, and then he came back and I said, 'By the way, Bill, I've got the real masters.'"

== Release and critical reception ==
Professional ratings
Review scores
Source	Rating
AllMusic	4.5/5 stars
Classic Rock	9/10
Number One	3/5
The Philadelphia Inquirer	4/5 stars
Record Collector	4/5 stars
Rolling Stone	4/5 stars
The Rolling Stone Album Guide	4.5/5 stars
Smash Hits	8/10
Spin Alternative Record Guide	9/10
The Village Voice	C

Rebel Yell was released to commercial success. In the United States, the album peaked at number six on the Billboard 200, and it also peaked in the top ten in other countries, including Canada, Germany, and New Zealand. The Recording Industry Association of America (RIAA) certified it double platinum for shipments of two million copies across the United States. Four singles – "Rebel Yell", "Eyes Without a Face", "Flesh for Fantasy", and "Catch My Fall" – were released from the album. The accompanying music videos for all singles received heavy airplay on television channel MTV. Idol's longtime girlfriend Perri Lister can be seen in the front row during the video for "Rebel Yell".

Upon its release, Rebel Yell received positive reviews from critics. Parke Puterbaugh of Rolling Stone called it "a ferocious record, sharp as a saber, hard as diamond, as beautiful and seductive as the darker side of life with which it flirts", and ultimately "an intelligent assault upon the senses" at a time "when too much of what comes over the airwaves is all sweetness and light, or mere undifferentiated head-banging". In Smash Hits, Kimberley Leston praised Idol and Stevens for "stirring together rock, disco and punk elements without forgetting the importance of a good tune." Robert Christgau, however, suggested in The Village Voice that music videos "have been the making of this born poser's career and the unmaking of his music", quipping, "if you've got no taste for the sound of the sneer, the visuals definitely aren't fantasy enough."

In the 2004 Rolling Stone Album Guide, Rob Sheffield highlighted the wide-ranging music on Rebel Yell, calling it "a brilliant combination of punk, disco, synth pop, glam rock, metal, and mud wrestling". AllMusic editor Stephen Thomas Erlewine concluded, "Each stylistic turn is distinguished by Idol's gusto. He's unafraid to be gloriously, shameless tacky, a quality that separated him from his new wave peers then and continues to give Rebel Yell a trashy kick years after its release." Writing for Record Collector, Simon Price deemed it "essentially a dance record", crediting Forsey with taking influence from krautrock and disco "to machine-tool Billy Idol's music into an irresistibly metronomic force". Classic Rock's Dom Lawson lauded Rebel Yell as "an 80s hard rock pinnacle" which marked Idol's "transformation into the ultimate MTV-generation rock star".

In 1999, EMI Music reissued Rebel Yell as part of their "Expanded" series. The new version of the album included previously unreleased bonus tracks and expanded liner notes. In 2010, audiophile label Audio Fidelity reissued a 24-karat CD remastered in HDCD by Steve Hoffman.

== Track listing ==
All tracks are written by Billy Idol and Steve Stevens, except where noted.

Side one
No.	Title	Length
1.	"Rebel Yell"	4:45
2.	"Daytime Drama"	4:02
3.	"Eyes Without a Face"	4:58
4.	"Blue Highway"	5:05
Total length:		18:50

Side two
No.	Title	Writer(s)	Length
1.	"Flesh for Fantasy"		4:37
2.	"Catch My Fall"	Idol	3:42
3.	"Crank Call"		3:56
4.	"(Do Not) Stand in the Shadows"		3:10
5.	"The Dead Next Door"		3:45
Total length:			19:10

1999 expanded edition bonus tracks
No.	Title	Writer(s)	Length
10.	"Rebel Yell" (session take)		5:27
11.	"Motorbikin'" (session take)	Christopher Spedding	4:16
12.	"Catch My Fall" (original demo)		4:11
13.	"Flesh for Fantasy" (session take)		5:09
14.	"Blue Highway" (original demo)		5:00

== Personnel ==
=== Musicians ===
- Billy Idol – vocals, guitar
- Steve Stevens – guitar, Casio synthesiser, keyboards, bass guitar
- Judi Dozier – keyboards
- Steve Webster – bass guitar
- Thommy Price – drums
- Sal Cuevas – bass guitar on "Eyes Without a Face"
- Jack Waldman – additional keyboards
- Mars Williams – saxophone on "Catch My Fall"
- Gregg Gerson – drums on "(Do Not) Stand in the Shadows", "Rebel Yell" (Session Take), "Motorbikin'" (Session Take) and "Flesh for Fantasy" (Session Take)
- Perri Lister – backing vocals on "Eyes Without a Face"
- Keith Forsey – drum programming (uncredited)
- Phil Feit – bass guitar on "Rebel Yell" (Session Take), "Motorbikin'" (Session Take), and "Flesh for Fantasy" (Session Take)

=== Technical staff ===
- Keith Forsey – producer
- Michael Frondelli – engineer, mixing
- Dave Wittman – engineer, mixing
- Gary Hellman – engineer
- Steve Rinkoff – engineer
- Pete Thea – engineer
- George Marino – mastering
- Brian Griffin – photography
- Michael MacNeil – cover design
- Stephanie Tudor – production co-ordination
- Bob Norberg – mastering (1999 expanded edition)
- Kevin Flaherty – compilation (1999 expanded edition)

== Charts ==
=== Weekly charts ===
Weekly chart performance for Rebel Yell
Chart (1984–1985)	Peak position
Australian Albums (Kent Music Report)	16
Canada Top Albums/CDs (RPM)	8
Dutch Albums (Album Top 100)	31
European Albums (Music & Media)	40
German Albums (Offizielle Top 100)	2
New Zealand Albums (RMNZ)	2
Swiss Albums (Schweizer Hitparade)	16
UK Albums (Official Charts)	36
US Billboard 200	6

=== Year-end charts ===
1984 year-end chart performance for Rebel Yell
Chart (1984)	Position
Australian Albums (Kent Music Report)	53
Canada Top Albums/CDs (RPM)	18
German Albums (Offizielle Top 100)	62
New Zealand Albums (RMNZ)	7
US Billboard 200	16

1985 year-end chart performance for Rebel Yell
Chart (1985)	Position
German Albums (Offizielle Top 100)	20

== Certifications ==
Certifications for Rebel Yell
Region	Certification	Certified units/sales
Brazil (Pro-Música Brasil) Expanded Edition	Platinum	250,000^{‡}
Canada (Music Canada)	5× Platinum	500,000^{^}
Germany (BVMI)	Gold	250,000^{^}
New Zealand (RMNZ)	Platinum	15,000^{^}
United Kingdom (BPI)	Silver	60,000^{^}
United States (RIAA)	2× Platinum	2,000,000^{^}
^{^} Shipments figures based on certification alone.^{‡} Sales+streaming figures based on certification alone.
