= Eyes Without a Face (song) =

- Cover of 12" vinyl single

Single by Billy Idol

from the album Rebel Yell
- B-side: "The Dead Next Door"
- Released: April 1984 (US); 5 June 1984 (UK)
- Studio: Studio A, Electric Lady Studios (New York, New York)
- Genre: New wave; synth-rock
- Length: 4:58 (album/video version); 4:08 (single version)
- Label: Chrysalis
- Songwriters: Billy Idol; Steve Stevens
- Producer: Keith Forsey

Billy Idol singles chronology
"Rebel Yell" (1983)	"Eyes Without a Face" (1984)	"Flesh for Fantasy" (1984)

Audio sample
- file; help

Music video
- "Eyes Without a Face" on YouTube

"Eyes Without a Face" is a song by the English rock singer Billy Idol, from Idol's second studio album Rebel Yell (1983). It was released in April 1984 as the second single from the album in the US, and in June of that year in the UK. The ballad is softer in character than most of the album's other singles. It reached number four on the Billboard Hot 100, becoming Idol's first top ten hit in the US. The song's title was borrowed from the 1960 French horror film Eyes Without a Face (Les yeux sans visage).

== Background ==
In his memoir, Dancing with Myself (2014), Idol explained he had always been fascinated with old black and white horror films, including the 1960 French film Les Yeux sans visage (Eyes Without a Face), directed by Georges Franju. The film concerns a plastic surgeon who vowed to restore the face of his daughter who had been disfigured in a car crash; this quest leads him to murder victims and graft their facial features onto his daughter in an attempt to restore her beauty. By the end, all that remains of her original face is her eyes, thus making her "eyes without a face". Idol saw some parallel between the film and the moral decay he experienced living in New York in the 1980s:

I started to use "Eyes Without a Face" as a possible title/lyric/chorus for the song. I began to write words that, in some disguised form, spoke about my life in New York and a relationship gone wrong, on the edge of disintegrating into madness. Perhaps I was reflecting on my own touring infidelities. In a way, those [types of relationships] can leave you feeling soulless, especially if you're already in a relationship that you value but are degrading by looking elsewhere for additional sexual kicks.

In the studio, Idol gave guitarist Steve Stevens the melody, lyrics and basic structure. Stevens fleshed it out with a revolving four-chord pattern (Emaj7–C#m–G#m–B). Stevens then came up with a hard rock guitar riff in the middle of the song. Idol improvised rap verses over the riff because "rap was everywhere in New York at the time, in all the discos and clubs, so it made sense after my croon to start talking streetwise over Steve's supersonic barrage of sound."

Idol's then-girlfriend Perri Lister sings backing vocals during the chorus, repeating the French phrase "Les yeux sans visage" ("Eyes without a face"), the original title of the film.

Idol wanted a prominent bass guitar part reminiscent of reggae. He and Stevens had trouble with this part of the song until they met bassist Sal Cuevas, a New York musician best known for working in salsa music and on Broadway, who performed the part to their satisfaction.

== Critical reception ==
Cashbox called the song "more subdued" and "more sensitive" than Idol's previous single "Rebel Yell" and noted "a silky acoustic guitar backdrop and a probing melodic bass line".

In a retrospective review of the single, AllMusic journalist Donald A. Guarisco wrote: "The music plays against the dark tone of the lyrics with a ballad-styled melody comprised of yearning verses that slowly build emotion and a quietly wrenching chorus that relieves the emotional tension in a cathartic manner."

== Music video ==
The video was released in June 1984 and subsequently nominated for MTV Video Music Awards for Best Editing and Best Cinematography. It was shot over an exhausting three-day period on a set with fog machines, lighting, and fire sources. Immediately after the shoot, Idol flew to perform in Arizona, where he discovered that his contact lenses had fused to his eyeballs, attributing it to the harsh video shoot and dry plane air. He was taken to a hospital where the lenses were removed and his eyes bandaged for three days, until his scraped corneas grew back.

== Personnel ==
- Billy Idol – vocals
- Steve Stevens – electric and acoustic guitars
- Sal Cuevas – bass guitar
- Judi Dozier – synthesisers
- Keith Forsey – drum machine
- Perri Lister – backing vocals

== Formats and track listings ==
- UK 7" vinyl single
1. "Eyes Without a Face"
2. "The Dead Next Door"
- UK 12" vinyl single
1. "Eyes Without a Face"
2. "The Dead Next Door"
3. "Dancing with Myself"
4. "Rebel Yell"

US 7" styrene single

1. "Eyes Without a Face"
2. "Blue Highway"

== Charts ==
=== Weekly charts ===
Weekly chart performance for "Eyes Without a Face"
Chart (1984)	Peak position
Australia (Kent Music Report)	12
Belgium (Ultratop 50 Flanders)	15
Canada (The Record)	11
Canada Top Singles (RPM)	6
Europe (Eurochart Hot 100)	38
France (SNEP)	50
Germany (GfK)	10
Ireland (IRMA)	13
Italy (Musica e Dischi)	18
Netherlands (Dutch Top 40)	24
Netherlands (Single Top 100)	13
New Zealand (Recorded Music NZ)	4
Switzerland (Schweizer Hitparade)	21
UK Singles (Official Charts)	18
US Billboard Hot 100	4
US Cashbox	4

=== Year-end charts ===
1984 year-end chart performance for "Eyes Without a Face"
Chart (1984)	Position
Australia (Kent Music Report)	86
Canada Top Singles (RPM)	45
New Zealand (Recorded Music NZ)	49
US Billboard Hot 100	37
US Cashbox	25
West Germany (Official German Charts)	60

== Certifications ==
Certifications for "Eyes Without a Face"
Region	Certification	Certified units/sales
Brazil (Pro-Música Brasil)	Gold	30,000^{‡}
Italy (FIMI)	Gold	50,000^{‡}
New Zealand (RMNZ)	2× Platinum	60,000^{‡}
United Kingdom (BPI)	Platinum	600,000^{‡}
^{‡} Sales+streaming figures based on certification alone.
