= Sigue Sigue Sputnik discography =

- Studio albums: 6
- Compilation albums: 11
- Singles: 15
- Video albums: 2

This is the discography of British new wave band Sigue Sigue Sputnik.

== Albums ==
=== Studio albums ===
Title	Album details	Peak chart positions								
Title	Album details	UK	AUS	AUT	FIN	GER	NL	NZ	SWE	US
Flaunt It	Released: 28 July 1986; Label: Parlophone; Formats: CD, LP, MC	10	70	16	4	33	58	16	29	96
Dress for Excess	Released: December 1988; Label: Parlophone; Formats: CD, LP, MC	53	—	—	35	—	—	—	—	—
Sputnik: The Next Generation (as Sputnik: The Next Generation featuring Hotei)	Released: 24 January 1996; Label: EMI; Formats: CD; Japan-only release	—	—	—	—	—	—	—	—	—
Piratespace	Released: February 2001; Label: Sputnikworld; Formats: CD	—	—	—	—	—	—	—	—	—
Blak Elvis vs. The Kings of Electronic Rock and Roll	Released: February 2002; Label: Sputnikworld; Formats: CD	—	—	—	—	—	—	—	—	—
Ultra Real	Released: February 2003; Label: Sputnikworld; Formats: CD	—	—	—	—	—	—	—	—	—
"—" denotes releases that did not chart or were not released in that territory.

=== Compilation albums ===
Title	Album details
The First Generation	Released: 1990; Label: Jungle; Formats: CD, LP, MC
The Ultimate 12" Collection	Released: 1998; Label: Sputnikworld; Formats: CD; Limited release
Sci-Fi Sex Stars	Released: 2000; Label: Sputnikworld; Formats: CD; Limited release
21st Century Boys: The Best of Sigue Sigue Sputnik	Released: 12 February 2001; Label: EMI; Formats: CD
The Very Best of SSSputnik	Released: 2004; Label: Self-released; Formats: CD
The Early Years	Released: 2006; Label: Self-released; Formats: CD
Ray of Light	Released: 1 January 2007; Label: Cleopatra; Formats: CD, digital download; Limited release
The Remixes	Released: 6 July 2007; Label: Parlophone; Formats: digital download
Very Best of SSSputnik...Compilation 2	Released: 2007; Label: Self-released; Formats: CD
1984 Flaunt It Demos + More	Released: 8 July 2008; Label: Cleopatra; Formats: LP; Limited release
DemoBomb	Released: 7 January 2013; Label: Sputnikworld; Formats: digital download

=== Video albums ===
Title	Album details
Live in Tokyo	Released: 2003; Label: Music Mine; Formats: DVD
Visions of Sputnik	Released: 2007; Label: Self-released; Formats: DVD

== Singles ==
Title	Year	Peak chart positions										Album
Title	Year	UK	AUS	AUT	FIN	GER	IRE	NZ	SPA	SWI	US Dance	Album
"Love Missile F1-11"	1986	3	32	2	3	3	3	21	1	6	50	Flaunt It
"21st Century Boy"	1986	20	—	—	4	28	16	—	6	24	—	Flaunt It
"Sex Bomb Boogie"	1986	—	—	—	—	—	—	—	—	—	—	Flaunt It
"Rockit Miss U.S.A." / "Teenage Thunder" (as Sci-Fi Sex Stars)	1986	121	—	—	—	—	—	—	—	—	—	Flaunt It
"Massive Retaliation" (US-only release)	1986	—	—	—	—	—	—	—	—	—	—	Flaunt It
"Success"	1988	31	141	—	—	—	28	49	—	—	25	Dress for Excess
"Dancerama"	1989	50	—	—	23	—	—	—	—	—	—	Dress for Excess
"Albinoni vs Star Wars"	1989	75	—	—	—	—	—	—	—	—	—	Dress for Excess
"Rio Rocks"	1989	104	—	—	—	—	—	—	—	—	—	Dress for Excess
"Cyberspace Party" (as Sputnik: The Next Generation featuring Hotei; Japan-only release)	1995	—	—	—	—	—	—	—	—	—	—	Sputnik: The Next Generation
"Love Missile F1-11" (WestBam remix; Germany-only release)	2001	—	—	—	—	—	—	—	—	—	—	Non-album singles
"Everybody Loves You" (vs. Northern Lite; Germany-only release)	2002	—	—	—	—	—	—	—	—	—	—	Non-album singles
"Grooving with Mr. Pervert"	2003	—	—	—	—	—	—	—	—	—	—	Non-album singles
"Into the Unknown" (free digital-only release via sputnikworld.com)	2009	—	—	—	—	—	—	—	—	—	—	Non-album singles
"C'mon Everybody" (Japan digital-only release)	2011	—	—	—	—	—	—	—	—	—	—	Non-album singles
"—" denotes releases that did not chart or were not released in that territory.

=== Other releases ===
- 1986: The 12" Mixes ("Rockit Miss USA" (Remix)/"She's My Man" (Remix)/"Interview" (12" and cassette limited release – 1000 copies given away free with the album Flaunt It at HMV)
- 1987: "Rio Rocks" (7" promo split with "Unchain My Heart" by Joe Cocker – only released in Argentina)
- 1988: "Hey Jane Mansfield Superstar!" (12" promo – only released in Brazil)

=== Other album appearances ===
- 1986: Armed & Dangerous OST (includes the SSS track "She's My Man")
- 1989: Rude Awakening OST (includes the SSS track "Success")
- 1990: David Bowie Songbook (free CD included with magazine and includes the SSS version of "Rebel Rebel")
- 1990: A Tribute to Prince: Party O' the Times (includes the SSS version of "I Could Never Take the Place of Your Man")
- 2000: Virgin Voices: A Tribute to Madonna – Volume Two (includes the SSS version of "Ray of Light")
- 2000: Don't Blow Your Cover: A Tribute to KMFDM (includes the SSS version of "Virus")
- 2000: Covered in Nails: A Tribute to Nine Inch Nails (includes the SSS version of "Piggy")
- 2001: A Gothic–Industrial Tribute to Smashing Pumpkins (includes the SSS version of "Bullet with Butterfly Wings")
- 2002: A Tribute to Johnny Thunders: I Only Wrote This Song for You (includes the SSS version of "Personality Crisis")
- 2005: Tribute to Thunderbirds – 40th Anniversary Special (includes the SSS version of "Thunderbirds Are Go!")
- 2005: This Is Not Retro (includes the SSS track "Pussywhipper")
- 2011: All Time Super Guest by Hotei (featuring the collaboration with SSS on the track "C'mon Everybody")
- 2016: Ferris Bueller's Day Off OST (includes the SSS track "Love Missile F1-11")
- 2016: Say I'm Your Number One: Stock, Aitken & Waterman (30 CD box set includes a 10 track EP of the SSS track "Success")
