= Rio Rocks =

1989 single by Sigue Sigue Sputnik

Single by Sigue Sigue Sputnik

from the album Dress for Excess
- B-side: "Aliens"
- Released: 31 July 1989
- Recorded: 1987
- Genre: Synth-pop
- Length: 4:42 (single version); 5:18 (album version)
- Label: Parlophone
- Songwriter(s): Anthony James; Martin Degville; Neal Whitmore
- Producer(s): Liminha

Sigue Sigue Sputnik singles chronology
"Albinoni vs Star Wars" (1989)	"Rio Rocks" (1989)	"Cyberspace Party" (1995)

"Rio Rocks" is a song by British band Sigue Sigue Sputnik released in July 1989 as the fourth and final single from their second album Dress for Excess. It was the last single released before the band split and failed to make the UK Singles Chart Top 100, though bubbled under, peaking at number 104.

== Background and release ==
Following their debut album Flaunt It in 1986, Sigue Sigue Sputnik set about figuring out how to follow it up. The resulting album, Dress for Excess, the recording of which was described as "madness" by Tony James with no overall plan and a number of different producers, finally saw its release three years after Flaunt It in 1989. One of the producers was Brazilian Liminha who was specifically brought in during the summer of 1987 for "Rio Rocks" – this most likely came about due to the fact that Sigue Sigue Sputnik had sold particularly well in Brazil. To cash in on their popularity in Brazil, the band went on tour there in 1989 to promote the release of Dress for Excess. They expected to end up millionaires; however, they did not realise "that it was really hard to get the money out of the country with the Brazil/Pound exchange rate being completely ridiculous" and to add to that, the tour manager they had brought in "had stolen all the money earned from the Brazilian tour to feed his own serious drug habit".

"Rio Rocks" was written for the band's Brazilian fans and was heavily influenced by "La Bamba". It was originally schedule for release as a single in September 1987, but this never materialised. Coincidentally, a promotional split single was released in Argentina in 1987 with a unique shorter version of "Rio Rocks" as the A-side and Joe Cocker's version of "Unchain My Heart" as the B-side. "Rio Rocks" was finally commercially released at the end of July 1989 backed with "Aliens", written and produced by the band. One of the versions released was a 'samba' version, which was a re-recording in Rio de Janeiro in May 1989 following the Brazilian tour and features the Mangueira Samba School. A music video was also released featuring footage of the band's tour of Brazil.

== Reception ==
Reviewing for Record Mirror, Tim Nicholson described "Rio Rocks" as the "grungeous groovy step sister" of the band's previous single "Albinoni vs Star Wars", and "as banal as their opening shot 'Love Missile F1-11'". Ian Gittins for Melody Maker described the song as "truly abject, a pissed-Brits conga round some Latin fiesta", and, similarly, Ben Thompson for New Musical Express described it as "an awe-inspiringly dreadful Latin-American fiasco".

== Track listings ==
7": Parlophone / SSS 6

1. "Rio Rocks" – 4:42
2. "Aliens" – 2:35

12": Parlophone / 12 SSS 6

1. "Rio Rocks" (Extended) – 6:36
2. "Aliens" – 5:12

12": Parlophone / 12 SSSX 6

1. "Rio Rocks" (Samba) – 5:58
2. "Rio Rocks" (Acid) – 5:56
3. "Rio Rocks" (7" Samba) – 4:00

CD: Parlophone / CD SSS 6

1. "Rio Rocks" – 4:42
2. "Rio Rocks" (Extended) – 6:36
3. "Rio Rocks" (Samba) – 5:58

== Charts ==
Chart (1989)	Peak position
UK Singles Chart (Gallup)	104
