= Sex Bomb Boogie =

1986 single by Sigue Sigue Sputnik

- Cover of the single released in Germany

Single by Sigue Sigue Sputnik

from the album Flaunt It
- B-side: "Dancerama"; "Love Missile F1-11
- Released: September 1986
- Genre: New wave
- Length: 3:29; 3:46 (video mix); 4:48 (album version)
- Label: Parlophone; PMI
- Songwriters: Anthony James; Martin Degville; Neal Whitmore
- Producer: Giorgio Moroder

Sigue Sigue Sputnik singles chronology
"21st Century Boy" (1986)	"Sex Bomb Boogie" (1986)	"Rockit Miss U.S.A." (1986)

"Sex Bomb Boogie" is a song by the British new wave band Sigue Sigue Sputnik, released as single from their debut album Flaunt It. It was only released as a vinyl single in Germany and as a video-only in the UK.

== Background and release ==
After the success of "Love Missile F1-11" and "21st Century Boy", Tony James wanted to release "Sex Bomb Boogie" as the band's next single, seeing it as "the third in the trilogy". There had been pressure to release the synth-driven "Atari Baby" as the next single, but James refused, sticking with "Sex Bomb Boogie".

For the single's release, the album version of "Sex Bomb Boogie" was remixed and notably features the addition of the interpolation of the Queen of the Night aria from Wolfgang Amadeus Mozart's opera The Magic Flute. It was released as a single in Germany in September 1986 with the B-side "Dancerama", an early version of the song later released a single in 1989 from the band's second album Dress for Excess. The 12-inch single features a different B-side, "Sex Bomb Dance", a remixed version of the A-side. This record also states that it was re-recorded in October 1986 at Westside Studios in London, so it is unknown when the 12-inch was released, though it was most likely in November.

James also came up with the idea of releasing "Sex Bomb Boogie" as a video-only single. It was released in the UK on VHS in December 1986, becoming the first ever video-only single. Described as a 12-inch max special, the entire single was 10 minutes long, with a retail price of approximately £5, making it over three and a half times more expensive than a 7-inch single then. The price also made it ineligible to chart on the UK singles chart as it exceeded Gallup's maximum price of £2.24.

Whilst the video single version of "Sex Bomb Boogie" is longer than the 7-inch single, they are the same recordings, with the video having a slightly longer introduction and ending to allow for the title and end credits. The first twenty seconds of the video show the copyright warning and the video distributor, Picture Music International. "Sex Bomb Boogie" then begins with the title sequence "Sputnik part 3 The story continues". The video features footage of the band performing at the Royal Albert Hall in October 1986, as well as shots from the film The Terminator. They were able to get permission to use footage from the film because James' then-girlfriend Janet Street-Porter knew someone at the film's UK distributor Hemdale and for a small fee the band were allowed to use any of the film footage so long as it did not include Arnold Schwarzenegger. The video single's B-side, "Love Missile F1-11", is a live version performed by the band at the Royal Albert Hall and, as well as showing the band's performance, the video features several short interviews of fans at the concert during some of the instrumental sections.

== Reception ==
Reviewed in Music Week, it was questioned "which chart do Tony James & Co intend to top? They presumably can't to the singles chart (SSS outsell Berlin?), they won't sell enough to make the LP chart, so these brave pioneers will be top of a new chart with no competition, and of which anyone with half a brain will take no notice". The review added that "customers will be quite thin on the ground, particularly as the video is no more than adequate and the song is less than adequate".

The single failed to chart in Germany, but the video single did chart in the UK. It peaked at number 19 on a music video chart compiled by Music Week Research in January 1987.

== Track listing ==
7": Parlophone / 1C 006-20 1564 7 (Germany)

1. "Sex Bomb Boogie" (Magic Flute) – 3:29
2. "Dancerama" – 4:25

12": Parlophone / 1C K 060-20 1565 6 (Germany)

1. "Sex Bomb Boogie" (Magic Flute) – 5:44
2. "Sex Bomb Dance" – 4:21

VHS: PMI / MVW 9900642 (UK)

1. Sex Bomb Boogie" (Video Mix) – 3:46
2. "Love Missile F1-11" (6 Min US. Remix) – 5:39

== Personnel ==
Musicians

- Martin Degville – vocals
- Tony James – space guitar
- Neal X – 'big' guitar
- Ray Mayhew – electronic drums
- Chris Kavanagh – electronic drums
- Laslo – drum machine (Linn 9000)
- Miss Yana Ya Ya – special effects
- Phenomena – backing vocals, voice over

Technical

- Giorgio Moroder – producer
- Brian Reeves – engineer
- Laslo – programming
- Guido Harari – photography
- Bill Smith Studio – artwork
