= Rockit Miss U.S.A. =

1986 single by Sci-Fi Sex Stars

- Censored cover of the 12-inch single

Single by Sci-Fi Sex Stars

from the album Flaunt It
- A-side: "Teenage Thunder"
- Released: October 1986
- Recorded: 1986
- Genre: Synth-pop; synthpunk; new wave; glam punk
- Length: 6:08 (album version); 4:02 (single version)
- Label: Who M I?
- Songwriters: Anthony James; Martin Degville; Neal Whitmore
- Producer: Giorgio Moroder

Sci-Fi Sex Stars singles chronology
"Sex Bomb Boogie" (1986)	"Rockit Miss U.S.A." (1986)	"Massive Retaliation" (1986)

"Rockit Miss U.S.A" is a song by the British band Sigue Sigue Sputnik, released as a single in October 1986 under the pseudonym Sci-Fi Sex Stars. It was released as a double A-sided single with "Teenage Thunder" and peaked at number 121 on the UK Singles Chart.

== Background and release ==
After the success of "Love Missile F1-11" and "21st Century Boy", Sigue Sigue Sputnik decided to release a single under the pseudonym 'Sci-Fi Sex Stars', described as their "alter ego", under which they had also done some gigs. Taken from their debut album Flaunt It, the two songs "Rockit Miss U.S.A." and "Teenage Thunder" were produced by Giorgio Moroder; however, they were remixed by the band for the single release. It was released on their short-lived independent label Who M I?.

The 12-inch single features extended versions of "Rockit Miss U.S.A." and "Teenage Thunder". Two other tracks feature on the release: a "Commercial Break", which promotes the band's performance at the Royal Albert Hall, and "Suicide", an homage to the band of the same name, which was recorded live in September 1986.

Prior to the single's release, the remix of "Rockit Miss U.S.A." had been released as a promotional 12-inch single. Limited to 1,000 copies and exclusive to HMV, it was released free with the box set release of Flaunt It under the Sigue Sigue Sputnik name. It differs from the 'Sci-Fi Sex Stars' release, in that the other tracks featured are a remix of "She's My Man" and an interview with the band. A promotional cassette single was also released, titled 'The 12" Mixes", featuring the same track listing as the free single.

In 2000, a CD was released under the Sci-Fi Sex Stars name featuring remixed and reimagined tracks recorded between 1991 and 2000 based on the original Sci-Fi Sex Stars single.

== Reception ==
Reviewing for Record Mirror, Stuart Bailie wrote that "it all gets a bit sad when you don't know if this is the Sputniks being dead zany, or someone else taking the piss. If it is them, it's just dreadful, and if it's some kind of spoof, well, it isn't at all funny". For Number One, Max Bell wrote that "here Sigue Sigue Sputnik are found masquerading as three trans-sexuals on an independent label! What excellent sport they do play upon us gullible groundlings in the bear pit, how delightfully they fleece us. The Sci-Fis scratch up a melange of fashionable found sounds, obligatory bits of Clint, rock 'n' roll guitar and that hypnotic tape loop rhythm with gusto to spare". Simon Mills for Smash Hits described it as "much like the last two S."S".S. "vinyl outings" and I find it rather charming, really. There's a bit of movie dialogue about a "machine wrapped in flesh", a lot of synthesiser gubbins and an "ad" at the end of side one for the group's concert at the Albert Hall which happened quite a long time ago now".

== Track listings ==
7": Who M I? / WMI 001 7

1. "Rockit Miss U.S.A." (Death Wish IV) – 4:02
2. "Teenage Thunder" (Sputstyle) – 4:32

12": Who M I? / WM 1001

1. "Rockit Miss U.S.A." (Death Wish IV) – 5:25
2. "Commercial Break" – 0:34
3. "Teenage Thunder" (Sputstyle) – 5:12
4. "Suicide" – 5:23

12" Promo: Parlophone / PSLP 342

1. "Rockit Miss U.S.A." (Death Wish IV)
2. "She's My Man" (Remix)
3. "Interview (Rock n Roll Year)"

Cassette Promo: Parlophone

1. "Rockit Miss U.S.A." (Death Wish IV)
2. "She's My Man" (Remix)
3. "From the Gutter to the Stars (Interview)"

== Charts ==
Chart (1986)	Peak position
UK Singles (OCC)	121
UK Indie (MRIB)	17
