= Generation (disambiguation) =

A generation is all of the people born and living at about the same time, regarded collectively.

Generation or generations may also refer to:

== Science and technology ==
- Generation (particle physics), a division of the elementary particles
- Generation in carrier generation and recombination, a process with mobile charge carriers (semiconductors)
- Generation in biology, a (usually multicellular) life stage, see biological life cycle
- Electricity generation
- Programming language generations, classes of a programming style's power

== Books ==
- Generations (Marvel Comics), a Marvel Comics series
- Superman & Batman: Generations, a DC Comics series
- Generations (book), a 1991 analysis of Anglo-American history by William Strauss and Neil Howe
- GENERATION: 25 Years of Contemporary Art in Scotland, a series of visual arts projects, exhibitions and events
- Generations (DC Comics), a limited series from DC Comics
- The Generation: The Rise and Fall of the Jewish Communists of Poland, a 1991 book about Polish-Jewish history

== Film and television ==
- Generation, a section of the Berlin International Film Festival comprising Generation Kplus and Generation 14plus
- A Generation, a 1955 Polish film directed by Andrzej Wajda
- Generation (Canadian TV program), a Canadian current affairs television program which aired on CBC Television in 1965
- Generation (film), a 1969 American comedy film
- Generations (American TV series), an American daytime soap opera that aired on NBC 1989–1991
- Star Trek Generations, the seventh Star Trek film (1994)
- Generations (South African TV series), a South African soap opera that aired on SABC1 1994–2010
- Generations, the second season of the American TV series Heroes (2007)
- Generation (TV series), a 2021 American dramedy television series on HBO Max
- MasterChef: Generations the 14th season of the American culinary reality program MasterChef
- Kamen Rider Generations, a Kamen Rider film pentalogy series (2016-2021):
  - Kamen Rider Heisei Generations: Dr. Pac-Man vs. Ex-Aid & Ghost with Legend Riders, a 2016 film
  - Kamen Rider Heisei Generations Final: Build & Ex-Aid with Legend Rider, a 2018 film
  - Kamen Rider Heisei Generations Forever, a 2019 film
  - Kamen Rider Reiwa: The First Generation, a 2019 film
  - Kamen Rider Beyond Generations, a 2021 film

== Music ==
- Generations, a folk duo consisting of Skylar Grey and her mother

=== Albums ===
- Generation (Anarchic System album) or the title song, 1975
- Generation (Audio Bullys album) or the title song, 2005
- Generation (Dexter Gordon album), 1973
- Generation (Hal Russell album) or the title song, 1982
- Generation (Kenny Burrell album) or the title song, 1987
- Generations (Bucky Pizzarelli and John Pizzarelli album), 2007
- Generations (Gary Burton album), 2004
- Generations (Journey album), 2005
- Generations (Pepper Adams and Frank Foster album) or the title song, 1985
- Generations (Steve Wilson album), 1998
- Generations, by Will Butler, 2020

=== Songs ===
- "Generation", by Arisa Mizuki from Arisa II: Shake Your Body for Me, 1992
- "Generation", by Black Rebel Motorcycle Club from Take Them On, On Your Own, 2003
- "Generation", by Emerson Hart, theme song for the TV series American Dreams, 2002
- "Generation", by Simple Plan from Simple Plan, 2008
- "Generations" (song), by Tetsuya Kakihara, 2013
- "Generations", by Don Diablo, 2014
- "Generations", by Inspiral Carpets from Revenge of the Goldfish, 1992
- "Generations", by Sara Groves from Conversations, 2001
- Generation (Acid Angel from Asia song), 2022

== Video games ==
- The Sims 3: Generations, a 2011 expansion pack for the video game The Sims 3
- Sonic Generations, a 2011 game in the Sonic the Hedgehog series
- Video game generations, in the history of video games and console technology

== Other ==
- Generation Investment Management, London-based asset management firm founded by Al Gore
- Generation (play), 1965 play
- Generation ship, a hypothetical type of starship
- Generation (Melbourne magazine) (1990–2000), Jewish magazine in Australia
- Generation (New York magazine), student publication of the State University of New York at Buffalo

== See also ==
- Social degeneration
- Generate (disambiguation)
- Generator (disambiguation)
- First generation (disambiguation)
- Second generation (disambiguation)
- Third generation (disambiguation)
- Fourth generation (disambiguation)
- Fifth generation (disambiguation)
- Sixth generation (disambiguation)
- Seventh generation (disambiguation)
