= Albinoni vs Star Wars =

1989 single by Sigue Sigue Sputnik

Single by Sigue Sigue Sputnik

from the album Dress for Excess
- Released: 8 May 1989
- Genre: Synth-pop
- Length: 5:14 (part 1); 4:37 (album version)
- Label: Parlophone
- Songwriters: Anthony James; Martin Degville; Neal Whitmore; Stephen Hague
- Producer: Stephen Hague

Sigue Sigue Sputnik singles chronology
"Dancerama" (1989)	"Albinoni vs Star Wars" (1989)	"Rio Rocks" (1989)

"Albinoni vs Star Wars" is a song by British band Sigue Sigue Sputnik released in May 1989 as the third single from their second album Dress for Excess. It was their last single to chart, peaking at number 75 on the UK Singles Chart.

== Background and release ==
"Albinoni vs Star Wars" is a version of "Adagio in G minor" (attributed to Tomaso Albinoni but largely written by Remo Giazotto). Tony James originally retitled it "Tarzan vs IBM" (originally a working title of Jean-Luc Godard's 1965 film Alphaville), but had to change it after finding out both Tarzan and IBM brand names were copyrighted and unable to be used. "Albinoni vs Stars Wars" interpolates the original composition using electronic percussion and synth and was programmed and produced by Stephen Hague.

It was released as a double A-sided single. The first side, parenthesised 'Part 1', features the interpolation of "Adagio in G minor" throughout and, as stated above, was produced by Hague. The other side, parenthesised 'Parts 1 and 2', features the interpolation for the first minute and a half, before transitioning into 'Part 2', produced by Neal X, featuring drum loops and guitars. This is the version found on the Dress for Excess album and production is credited to Hague and X.

The 12-inch single features extended versions of Parts 1 and 2, although unlike the 7-inch single, the flip side only consists of Part 2. A CD single was also released, consisting of the 7-inch Part 1, the two extended versions from the 12-inch single and an exclusive track with the parenthesis 'Bonus Beats'. The cover features a cartoon illustrated by Ron Smith, best known for his work for the comic 2000 AD.

== Music video ==
The music video is in the style of a film opening credits sequence and imitates the Star Wars opening crawl in displaying crawl text outlining the backstory and context to a film about a "Dark Secret" of Tomaso Albonini that remained unrevealed until 1989. The background throughout is a fixed shot of a sunset. The cast and crew credits include a number of fictional, made-up and real-life people: for example, Countess Almaviva (from The Marriage of Figaro); Georges Bizet; and Desmond True and Noble Strongheart playing two swordsmen.

== Reception ==
Reviewing for Record Mirror, Win member Davy Henderson wrote that the song "starts off a bit Franko, ie Frankie-ish" and that "it's actually better at 33rpm; you get a Mario Puzo, zabaglione, Once Upon A Time In America', 'Godfather', 'Scarface' kind of feeling. This record actually gives you audience participation, you slow it down for the strings and bring it up for the guitars". Bandmate Mani Shoniwa described it as "a real red winer, and it's a hittie. It's got to be Single Of The Week".

== Track listings ==
7": Parlophone / SSS 4

1. "Albinoni vs Star Wars" (Part 1) – 5:14
2. "Albinoni vs Star Wars" (Parts 1 and 2) – 4:40

12": Parlophone / 12 SSS 4

1. "Albinoni vs Star Wars" (Part 1 Extended) – 6:28
2. "Albinoni vs Star Wars" (Part 2 Extended) – 5:29

CD: Parlophone / CD SSS 4

1. "Albinoni vs. Star Wars" (Part 1) (7-inch version) – 5:12
2. "Albinoni vs Star Wars" (Part 1 Extended) – 6:28
3. "Albinoni vs Star Wars" (Part 2 Extended) – 5:29
4. "Albinoni vs Star Wars" (Part 2) (Bonus Beats) – 2:26

== Personnel ==
- Martin Degville – vocals
- Tony James – "space" guitar, vocals, design
- Neal X – guitar
- Miss Yana Ya Ya (Jane Farrimond) – keyboards, effects, vocals
- Chris Kavanagh – drum sampling
- Ray Mayhew – drum sampling
- Bill Mitchell – vocals ("deep voices")
- Sylvia Mason-James – vocals ("girly voices")
- Cheyne – vocals
- Mark Laff – vocals
- Stephen Hague – computer programming, producer
- Bill Smith Studio – design
- Ron Smith – illustration

== Charts ==
Chart (1989)	Peak position
UK Singles (OCC)	75
