= Dancerama =

1989 single by Sigue Sigue Sputnik

Single by Sigue Sigue Sputnik

from the album Dress for Excess
- B-side: "Barbarandroid"
- Released: 13 March 1989
- Recorded: 1988
- Genre: Synth-pop
- Length: 4:45 (album version); 3:44 (single mix)
- Label: Parlophone
- Songwriter(s): Anthony James; Martin Degville; Neal Whitmore
- Producer(s): Neal Whitmore

Sigue Sigue Sputnik singles chronology
"Success" (1988)	"Dancerama" (1989)	"Albinoni vs Star Wars" (1989)

"Dancerama" is a song by the British band Sigue Sigue Sputnik released in March 1989 as the second single from their second album Dress for Excess. It peaked at number 50 on the UK Singles Chart.

== Release ==
"Dancerama" was originally recorded in 1986. This early rough version was only released as the B-side to the 7-inch single "Sex Bomb Boogie" that was only released in Germany. This version then remained rare until it was included on the 2020 expanded re-release of Flaunt It.

Several different versions of the song were released as singles. The 7-inch release features a remix of "Dancerama" by Queen drummer Roger Taylor. The B-side "Barbarandroid" was also remixed by Taylor; however, this is not credited on the single. Three 12-inch singles were released. The first features, alongside the two 7-inch tracks, an extended version of "Dancerama". The second 12-inch release features the same 12" extended version, but it is subtitled 'Kashmir Remix'. It also has a remix of "Dancerama" that prominently features a saxophone, subtitled 'Saxy Remix'. Both of these versions were remixed by Neal X and Tony James at Abbey Road Studios on 1 February 1989. The final 12-inch release is a picture disc which contains five tracks, of which the final one is a hidden untitled track, lasting less than a minute. The first track is an introduction lasting two minutes and the second is the 7-inch remix of "Dancerama". The third is another remix of the track by Stephen W. Tayler, titled 'Album Mix Extended', and the fourth track is "Barbarandroid". A CD single was also released that features the 7-inch remix, the 12-inch extended and the 'Album Mix Extended' versions. "Barbarandroid" was not included on the release, although it is incorrectly listed on the insert.

Described by James as "cartoon manga like", two versions of the cover artwork were released. Both were conceived by James and designed and created by the Bill Smith Studio. The 7-inch single, CD single and the first 12-inch single feature the subtitle '[Or is it love!]' on the cover with a cartoon of two characters kissing. However, the cover of the second 12-inch release features the subtitle '[Or is it sex?]', with the explicit image (partially censored) of these two characters having sex.

== Music video ==
The inspiration for the music video was the 1962 sci-fi featurette La Jetée and was suggested by Janet Street-Porter, who at the time was going out with Tony James. It was filmed in Paris by Mark LeBon.

== Reception ==
Professional ratings
Review scores
Source	Rating
Number One	2/5 stars

Reviewing for Record Mirror, Tim Nicholson wrote "The Sputnik Corporation seems to be going into liquidation if this criminally limp excuse for a bit of plastic is anything to go by. Barry Blue may have got away with it 15 years ago, but Tony James really should know better. Perhaps if they sacked Dogville (ugly and tone deaf – I'm impressed), they might finally find what they've been looking for". The reviewer for the Huddersfield Daily Examiner wrote "I hate to admit it, but I don't find this throbbing love song – laced with a luscious layer of guitar-topping – half as nauseating as I hoped it would be". Reviewed in the Cambridge Evening News, the song was described as "by their own pitifully low standards, a neat and catchy song moving at a gentle, but effective pace".

== Track listings ==
7": Parlophone / SSS 5

1. "Dancerama" – 3:44
2. "Barbarandroid" – 4:21

12": Parlophone / 12 SSS 5

1. "Dancerama" (12" Extended) – 8:19
2. "Dancerama" (7" Mix) – 3:44
3. "Barbarandroid" – 4:21

12": Parlophone / 12 SSSX 5

1. "Dancerama" (Kashmir Remix) – 8:18
2. "Dancerama" (Saxy Remix) – 7:09
3. "Barbarandroid" – 4:21

12": Parlophone / 12 SSSPD 5

1. "The Dancerama Club" (Introduction) – 1:57
2. "Dancerama" (7" Mix) – 3:44
3. "Dancerama" (Album Mix Extended) – 5:45
4. "Barbarandroid" – 4:21
5. "Untitled" – 0:53

CD: Parlophone / CD SSS 5

1. "Dancerama" (7" Mix) – 3:44
2. "Dancerama" (12" Extended) – 8:22
3. "Dancerama" (Album Mix Extended) – 5:42

== Charts ==
Chart (1989)	Peak position
Finland (Suomen virallinen lista)	23
UK Singles (OCC)	50
