= Success (Sigue Sigue Sputnik song) =

1988 single by Sigue Sigue Sputnik

Single by Sigue Sigue Sputnik

from the album Dress for Excess
- B-side: "Frankenstein Cha-Cha-Cha"
- Released: 7 November 1988
- Studio: PWL, London
- Genre: Synth-pop
- Length: 3:50
- Label: Parlophone
- Songwriter(s): Anthony James; Martin Degville; Neal Whitmore
- Producer(s): Stock Aitken Waterman

Sigue Sigue Sputnik singles chronology
| "Massive Retaliation" (1986) | "Success" (1988) | "Dancerama" (1989) |

"Success" is a song by British band Sigue Sigue Sputnik released in November 1988 as the lead single from their second album Dress for Excess. It peaked at number 31 on the UK Singles Chart.

== Background and recording ==
Following the success of Sigue Sigue Sputnik's debut album Flaunt It in 1986, the record label wanted a new hit single. A cover of David Bowie's "Rebel Rebel" was touted as a possibility for release in January 1987. However, this was scrapped after, according to Tony James, lead singer Martin Degville "managed to come up with the worst vocal I had ever heard" during recording. After this, the band decided to stick to original material, and the beginnings of "Success" started to come together. After spending most of 1987 struggling to find a chorus for "Success", James had the idea of working with famed production trio Stock Aitken Waterman, seen as an odd collaboration given the latter's previous success with Hi-NRG pop records such as Dead or Alive's "You Spin Me Round (Like a Record)" and Rick Astley's "Never Gonna Give You Up". However, James has said that "it was one of my more perverse ideas, going against the obvious as always. Doing exactly what we should not do. Outrage working with pure pop". Neal X added that "the thinking was, we were the most hated band in the country, and they’re the most hated producers, why don’t we get together?". However, their collaboration proved to be difficult and in the end not emulate the success of either of the two parties' previous records.

After listening to a demo recording of "Success", Pete Waterman said that it would definitely be a hit and agreed to produce the song, promising it would "make the Beastie Boys sound like The Beatles". A week later he contacted James to inform him that apart from Degville needing to sing along to the guide vocal, the song was complete. This bemused the band, who hadn't been to the studio to record the track. According to James, the synthesised song that Waterman said was finished "did sound like a hit, that much was certain, but a hit for Kylie [Minogue] not Sigue Sigue Sputnik". The band and Waterman were at loggerheads over the lack of guitars and "heavy synths" on the track. At one point, the band decided to sneak into the PWL studio whilst Waterman was away to record their own version. In the end, the final result of "Success" was created and the band "came away with a Kylie record with a bit of Sputnik on it".

== Release ==
A number of different versions of "Success" were released as singles. The 7-inch release features "Frankenstein Cha-Cha-Cha", also written by the band, as the B-side, and it was produced by Brazilian Liminha. The standard 12-inch single features extended versions of "Success" and "Frankenstein Cha-Cha-Cha" as well as the 7-inch version of the former. Another version of this 12-inch single was released with a different cover sleeve depicting Peter Waterman wearing a wig in the same style as Degville along with the text "Is It Sputnik or Is It Waterman? Success at Any Cost... The Single". Another 12-inch release features a selection of acid mixes, and in the US, a six-track single featuring a variety of different mixes was released. A CD single was also released featuring the 7-inch single A-side and B-side, an extended mix of "Success" and "Last Temptation of Sputnik", which is exclusive to this release. James has partially blamed the single's release date for its poor chart performance, confessing that several months of "dicking around" with the track resulted in a later than planned release, with the track allegedly "swamped by Christmas singles".

== Music video ==
The original idea that James had for the music video was to film 100 famous people saying the word 'success', which would then be "cut together on top of the song, the famous voices obscuring the music underneath to make an anarchic mash up, like a TV news documentary". Celebrities like Kylie Minogue, Rick Astley, Simon Le Bon and the Pet Shop Boys were all filmed at clubs and parties. However, the only problem was that due to being filmed at night, "it all looked badly lit and a bit amateurish and dark", leading James to alter his idea for the video. He decided to film a party video of the band in Marbella, directed by Brian Duffy. The resulting music video for "Success" featured footage of this party with "all the 100 famous people demoted to tiny unrecognisable cameos overlaid silently over the blaring jaunty track". James has since described the video as "terrible" and that it "destroyed the whole image of Sputnik", blaming it for the single's poor chart performance.

== Reception ==
Reviewing for Record Mirror, Tim Nicholson wrote that "the sleeve carries a warning that this is "non rock and roll product distributed under pressure" which is a not very subtle reference to Sputnik's dissatisfaction with SAW's treatment of their space-age skiffle. Somehow, I don't think Pete Waterman is the man to blame for sounding like computerised Sham 69. On the reverse of the sleeve it asks "Is it Sputnik, or is it Waterman". Sadly, I think it's Sputnik".

== Track listings ==
7": Parlophone / SSS 3

1. "Success" – 3:50
2. "Frankenstein Cha-Cha-Cha" – 3:40

12": Parlophone / 12 SSS 3

1. "Success" (Extended Version) – 6:45
2. "Success" – 3:50
3. "Frankenstein Cha-Cha-Cha" (Extended Version) – 5:01

12": Parlophone / 12 SSSX 3

1. "Success" (Acid Mix #1) (Vox) – 4:20
2. "Success" (Acid Mix #2) (Inst) – 5:03
3. "Frankenstein Cha-Cha-Cha" – 3:40
4. "Success" (Balearacidic 12 Inch) – 6:04

12": EMI / V-56130 (US)

1. "Success" (12" Dance Mix) – 6:45
2. "Success" (7" Dance Mix) – 3:00
3. "Success" (Funky Mix) – 5:27
4. "Success" (Balaeracidic Mix) – 6:04
5. "Success" (Micro-Dot Dub) – 6:30
6. "Success" (Metal Hammer Mix) – 4:44

CD: Parlophone / CD SSS 3

1. "Success" (Seven Inch) – 3:50
2. "Frankenstein Cha-Cha-Cha" – 3:40
3. "Last Temptation of Sputnik" – 3:40
4. "Success" (Balaeracidic Twelve Inch) – 6:58

== Charts ==
| Chart (1988–89) | Peak position |
|---|---|
| Australia (ARIA) | 141 |
| Ireland (IRMA) | 28 |
| Italy (Musica e dischi) | 13 |
| New Zealand (Recorded Music NZ) | 49 |
| UK Singles (OCC) | 31 |
| US Dance Club Songs (Billboard) | 25 |
| US Hot Dance Music/Maxi-Singles Sales (Billboard) | 38 |
