= Flaunt It =

Flaunt It may refer to:

- Flaunt It (album), a 1986 album by Sigue Sigue Sputnik
- "Flaunt It" (song), a 2006 song by TV Rock
