= Regenerator =

Regenerator may refer to:

- Regenerative heat exchanger, a type of heat exchanger
- Regenerator (band), an independent record label set up in 2001
- Regenerator (Resident Evil), an enemy creature in the 2005 video game Resident Evil 4
- Regenerator – Live 1982, a UFO album
- Regenerator (EP), an EP by Autopilot Off
- Regenerator (telecommunications), a type of line repeater that includes a retiming function

== See also ==
- Generator (disambiguation)
- Regeneration (disambiguation)
