= 6th Shorty Awards =

Awards show for short-form social web media content

6th Annual Shorty Awards
- Date: April 7, 2014
- Location: Times Center, New York City
- Hosted by: Natasha Leggero

The ceremony for the 6th Shorty Awards took place on April 7, 2014, at the New York Times Center and was hosted by comedian Natasha Leggero. The show included appearances by Patton Oswalt, Jamie Oliver, Kristen Bell, Jerry Seinfeld, Moshe Kasher, Julie Klausner, Erin Brady, Guy Kawasaki, Matt Walsh, Retta, Us the Duo, Big Boi, Gilbert Gottfried, Thomas Middleditch, Billie Jean King and Leandra Medine. Winners included Jerry Seinfeld and Will Ferrell.

== Influencer Winners by category ==
Category	Winner
Best in Activism	Against Suicide, @AgainstSuicide
Best Actor	Aaron Paul, @aaronpaul_8
Best Actress	Retta, @unfoRETTAble
Best in Apps	Digg, @digg
Best in Art	Rachel Ryle, @rachelryle
Best Athlete	Billie Jean King, @BillieJeanKing
Best Author	Neil Gaiman, @neilhimself
Best Band	Fifth Harmony, @FifthHarmony
Barnes & Noble College's #BNCollege	Boston University's College of Communication, @comugrad
Best Blogger	Terrance Gaines, @BrothaTech
Best in Brazil	Midia NINJA, @midianinja & Porta dos Fundos, @portadosfundos
Best Celebrity	Ian McKellen (@IanMcKellen)
Best Charity	Nature Conservancy, @nature_org
Best Comedian	Patton Oswalt, @pattonoswalt
Cox BLUE's #BusinessInfluencer	Guy Kawasaki, @GuyKawasaki
Best Director	Paul Feig, @paulfeig
Best in Education	Paulo Miranda Nascimento, @Pirulla25
Best Fake Account	Modern Seinfeld, @SeinfeldToday
Best Fansite	News for TV Majors, @N4TVM
Best in Fashion	Man Repeller, @ManRepeller
Best in Food	Jamie Oliver, @jamieoliver
Best in Gaming	Polygon, @Polygon
Best GIF Maker	Trent Nelson, @trenthead
GIF of the Year	Matrix Cat
Best in Government	NASA Goddard, @NASAGoddard
Best in Green	Sustainable Cities, @sustaincities
A&E's Instagram Video of the Year	I Look Good by Paul Zedrich
Instagrammer of the Year	Dukk Deuce, @Dukk2
New York Life's #KeepGoodGoing Award	Dr. Jen Arnold, @JenArnoldMD
Kickstarter of the Year	The Veronica Mars Movie Project
Muck Rack's Best Journalist	Sarah Jones, @SarahJReports
Best Maker	DIY, @DIY
Best Museum	Museum Nerd, @museumnerd
Best in Music	Questlove, @questlove
Newsworthy Photo of the Year	Pope Francis Introduction by Roberto Luigi
Best Non-Human	Cancellation Bear, @TheCancelBear
Best in Photography	David Guttenfelder, @dguttenfelder & Liz Eswein, @newyorkcityliz
Best Podcaster	This American Life, @ThisAmerLife
Best in Science	Black Girls Code, @BlackGirlsCode & Neil deGrasse Tyson, @neiltyson
Best Small Business	The Brooklyn Circus, @TheBKcircus
Best in Social Fitness	Tyler Graham, @_Tyler_Graham_
Best Sports Team	Los Angeles Dodgers, @Dodgers
Best in Teen Activism	Buddy Project, @ProjectBuddy
Tumblr of the Year	Amy Poehler's Smart Girls at the Party
Best TV Show	Scandal, @ScandalABC
Best in the UK	Ryan McHenry, @RyanWMcHenry
Best Video Blogger	Jullien Gordon, @JullienGordon
Vine of the Year	My reflection is cooler than me by Chad Jaxon Perez
Univision's Best Vineographer	Cupcake Dude, @TheDudeBakes & Pinot, @Pinot
Best Web Show	Comedians in Cars Getting Coffee, @JerrySeinfeld
Best in Weird	Buck Wolf, @wolfb
Best YouTube Star	Kid Fury, @KidFury

== Brand & Organization Winners by category ==
Category	Winner
Best Brand on Twitter	American Express
Best Brand on Vine	Oreo – 360i & GE & Mashable
Best Brand on Instagram	GoPro
Best Brand on Pinterest	Whole Foods Market
Best Brand on Snapchat	Wet Seal – ICED Media
Best Brand on Tumblr	Doctor Who & BBC America
Best Brand on YouTube	WWE
Best Facebook Page	GoPro
Unmetric's Best Facebook Campaign	Turning the Internet Red, Human Rights Campaign
Best Facebook Contest	This Is SportsCenter, Briggs & Stratton's Mower Mouth Contest by Lindsay, Stone & Briggs
Best Branded Mobile App	The WWE App
Best Branded Real-Time Response to a Major Event or Cultural Phenomenon	United Nations' #theworldneedsmore – Leo Burnett New York
Best Contest	Wheat Thins Flavor Protection – AKQA New York
Best Fortune 500 Brand on Social Media	American Express
Best Integration of Social Media with Live Television	The Voice: Instant Save – NBC, Talpa, Warner Horizon, One Three Media, Telescope
Best Listicle	27 Worst Moments Of John Oliver's First 6 Minutes Hosting The Daily Show – Comedy Central
Best Mobile Campaign	Join the Realm: Mobile, HBO – Definition 6
Best News Twitter Account	Al Jazeera America
Best Social Good Campaign	#SFBatKid, Greater Bay Area Make-A-Wish Foundation – Clever Girls Collective
Best Social Integration with a TV Commercial	never.no & Leo Burnett
Best Social Media Campaign for Film	The Wolverine – Way to Blue & Jump! Creative
Best Tumblr Campaign	"The Signal" Lexus – Team One
Best Twitter Campaign	#SFBatKid, Greater Bay Area Make-A-Wish Foundation – Clever Girls Collective
Best Use of a Hashtag on Twitter	The Voice: Instant Save – NBC, Talpa, Warner Horizon, One Three Media, Telescope
Best Use of Animated GIFs	The Purge – Universal Pictures and Brigade Marketing
Best Use of Gamification	Dodge: Hands On Ron Burgundy Game – Wieden+Kennedy
Best Use of Humor	Halloween Treats Gone Wrong, P&G / Oral B – Publicis Kaplan Thaler
Best Use of Social Media by One Brand Responding to Another Brand	Snack Attack, America Honda Motor Co., Inc. – RPA Advertising
Best Use of Social Media for a Consumer Brand	WestJet Christmas Miracle: Real -Time Giving
Best Use of Social Media for Auto Industry	Nissan – Versa Note Amazon Partnership – TBWA\Chiat\Day
Best Use of Social Media for B2B	Jobsite and Seven
Best Use of Social Media for Consumer Electronics	The Most Retweeted Brand Tweet Ever, Nokia – Wunderman
Best Use of Social Media for Customer Service	Samsung Mobile US Digital Marketing Team – Edelman
Best Use of Social Media for Fashion	Maui Jim – Moxie
Best Use of Social Media for Financial Services	Tweet & Shoot We Are Tennis by BNP Paribas – We Are Social
Best Use of Social Media for Food & Beverage	Say It With Bacon, Kraft Foods (Oscar Mayer) – 360i
Best Use of Social Media for Healthcare	Break Dengue – ZN
Best Use of Social Media for Luxury Goods	Need For Tweed, Harris Tweed Hebrides – Leo Burnett New York
Best Use of Social Media For Music	Avicii x You – Universal Music, House of Radon, Seventy Agency, At Night Management
Best Use of Social Media for News	Goodbye DOMA, Hello Marriage Equality: msnbc's Google+ Hangout
Best Use of Social Media for Retail or E-Commerce	DollarShaveClub.com – Conversocial
Best Use of Social Media for Sports	WWE WrestleMania 29
Best Use of Social Media for Telecom	O2 Be more dog – VCCP
Best Use of Social Media for Television	@MTVFR hacked Twitter with #TeenWolfFr – Darewin
Best Use of Social Media for Travel	WestJet Christmas Miracle: Real -Time Giving
Best Use of Social Media for Video Games	LEGO Marvel Super Heroes
Best Use of Social Media In Real Life	United Nations' #theworldneedsmore – Leo Burnett New York
Best Use of Video in a Social Media Campaign	Virgin America Remixes the Safety Video
Best Viral Campaign	WestJet Christmas Miracle: Real -Time Giving
Most Creative Use of Technology for a Campaign	Tweet & Shoot We Are Tennis by BNP Paribas – We are Social
Best Small Agency	Clever Girls Collective
Best Mid-Sized Agency	Carrot Creative
Best Large Agency	360i
