= Generating =

Generating may refer to:

- Generation of electricity, as from an electrical generator
- A Cantonese classification of food in Chinese food therapy

== See also ==
- Generate (disambiguation)
- Generation (disambiguation)
