= First generation =

First generation, Generation I, or variants of this, may refer to:

== History ==
- 1G, the first generation of wireless telephone technology
- First generation of video game consoles, 1972–1983
- First generation computer, a vacuum-tube computer

== Music ==
- First Generation, an album by Van der Graaf Generator
- The First Generation, a 1990 compilation album by British band Sigue Sigue Sputnik

== Science and technology ==
- First generation of three in the standard Model of particle physics
- First-generation antihistamine, the oldest H_{1}-antihistaminergic drugs
- First-generation programming language, any of a class of machine-level programming languages

== Other uses ==
- First Generation (sculpture), a sculpture by Chong Fah Cheong
- First-generation college students in the United States, college students whose parents did not attend college
- First-generation immigrant, a citizen or resident who is an immigrant or has immigrant parents
- Generation 1 (NASCAR), generation of cars 1948–1966
- Generation 1 in Pokémon, see List of generation I Pokémon
- Transformers: Generation 1, toy line which ran from 1984 to 1992

== See also ==
- Generation (disambiguation)
- Second generation (disambiguation)
