= Network 21 (television station) =

- Country: United Kingdom
- Broadcast area: London
- Headquarters: London

Programming
- Language: English
- Picture format: PAL 576i

Ownership
- Owner: Network 21

History
- Launched: April 4, 1986; 40 years ago
- Closed: April 3, 1987; 39 years ago

Availability

Terrestrial
- UHF (Crystal Palace): Channel 21

Although there were (and are) many pirate radio stations in London, Network 21 in 1986–1987 was one of the few pirate television stations to operate in Britain. Despite only broadcasting for half an hour on Friday nights in a part of the UHF waveband near the frequency occupied by ITV in the London area, it showcased what was happening in the then vibrant avant-garde arts scene at that time. Among others, artists like Genesis P-Orridge of Psychic TV appeared in programmes documenting their work. The station started broadcasting on UHF channel 21 from the Crystal Palace area on 4 April 1986.

== Vision ==
While the UK television industry was dominated by three companies (BBC, ITV franchise holders, Channel 4), Network 21 was an attempt to break the triopoly of the UK broadcasting industry. In an article in Broadcast Magazine, Network 21's aim was to "see a similar approach to TV as has been afforded to radio, for the BBC and ITV to release their monopoly on frequencies and make some available to the community", in the manner of low-power TV in the US. A press report by the London Evening Standard even claimed that the station had 100,000 viewers and that although it was very much in keeping with the post-punk DIY ethic, it was "definitely professional". The DIY element was that programming was shot on 8mm camcorders and transmitted on a domestic VCR connected to a UHF transmitter, but it was staffed by freelance journalists and artists.

There was also a pirate radio spin-off, which broadcast from 8 PM Friday night to early Saturday morning. The radio station generally played music from independent labels and artists (e.g. Coldcut appeared on the show) and discussion programmes.

While it received press attention, it was rarely raided. However, one raid occurred shy of its first birthday. Although Network 21 only lasted a few months, it had a small but significant impact.

== In popular culture ==
An advertisement for Network 21 was one of several notable paid advertisements included between the tracks and in the liner notes for the debut studio album Flaunt It (1986) by the British band Sigue Sigue Sputnik.

== See also ==
- Pirate television
- Pirate radio
