= Mark II =

Mark II or Mark 2 often refers to the second version of a product, frequently military hardware. "Mark", meaning "model" or "variant", can be abbreviated "Mk."

Mark II or Mark 2 may refer to:

== Military and weaponry ==
- 16"/50 caliber Mark 2 gun, a U.S. Navy gun that was never mounted on any operational ship
- Vickers Medium Mark II, an interwar British tank
- Cruiser Mk II, a World War II British tank
- Mk 2 grenade, an American grenade used in World War II, Korean War and the Vietnam War
- Gerber Mark II (1967), an American double-edged combat knife
- Ruger MK II (1982–2005), an American semi-automatic pistol
- Savage Mark II, a bolt action rimfire rifle
- Ruger M77 Mark II, an American bolt-action rifle
- Thin Man nuclear bomb or Mark 2 nuclear bomb (1945), a gun-type plutonium bomb
- Mark II, a variant of the British Mark I tank
- Merkava Mark II, a variant of the Israeli Merkava battle tank
- Supermarine Spitfire Mk II, a Spitfire variant with a stronger Merlin engine

== Vehicles ==
- British Rail Mark 2 (1964), a rail carriage design
- Jaguar Mark 2, an automobile produced from 1959 to 1967
- Continental Mark II (1956–1957), an American personal luxury car
- Ford Zephyr Mark II, an automobile produced in Australia and New Zealand
- Toyota Mark II, a series of Japanese car models
- Volkswagen Polo Mk2, an automobile produced between 1981 and 1994
- Bombardier ART Mark II, rolling stock used by Vancouver SkyTrain rapid transit
- Cooper Mark II, a single seater racing car
- Cooper T23, aka Cooper Mk. II, a Formula Two racing car

== Other technologies ==
- Mark II (radio telescope), a radio telescope in England, constructed in 1964
- Harvard Mark II (1947), a computer built at Harvard University and used by the US Navy
- RCA Mark II Sound Synthesizer (1957), a musical instrument made of electronic components
- Canon EOS-1D Mark II, a digital SLR camera
- Canon EOS-1Ds Mark II, a digital SLR camera
- Canon EOS-5D Mark II, a digital SLR camera
- Dräger Oxy 3000/6000 MK II, Self Contained Self Rescuer (Mining)
- Mesa Boogie Mark II, a Mesa Boogie Mark Series electric guitar amplifier model
- Technics SL-1200, a direct-drive turntable very popular with DJs
- Mariner Mark II, a proposed uncrewed spacecraft program
- SG-1000 II, also known as the Mark II, a redesigned version of the SG-1000 sold by Sega in 1984

== Other uses ==
- Mark 2 or Mark II, the second chapter of the Gospel of Mark in the New Testament of the Christian Bible
- Mark II of Alexandria, Patriarch of Alexandria in 141–152
- Pope Mark II of Alexandria, patriarch of the Coptic Church from 799 to 819
- Mark II of Constantinople, Ecumenical Patriarch in 1465–1466
- Mk II (album) a 1969 album by Steamhammer
- MK II (Masterplan album) (2007)
- MKII or Mortal Kombat II, a video game
- Gundam Mk-II, a robot of the fictional Gundam series
- Mark II (robot), a giant robot built by MegaBots Inc.
- Mark II (film), a 1986 New Zealand film
- Mark II line-up of rock band Deep Purple, the second and most celebrated line-up in the band's life span, with Ian Gillan, Ritchie Blackmore, Jon Lord, Roger Glover and Ian Paice
- The Guide Mark II from Mostly Harmless
- S/2015 (136472) 1, a moon of Makemake, nicknamed MK 2 by the discovery team

== See also ==
- Second generation (disambiguation)
- "Mark twain", meaning "mark two (fathoms)" nautical term used in depth sounding
