= Buck Wolf =

- Born: Ken Wolf; December 24, 1964 (age 61)
- Occupation: Executive editor of the Huffington Post

Buck Wolf is the managing editor of trends at The Huffington Post, and a former member of the Us Weekly Fashion Police.

Wolf writes on film, music and TV, but specializes in offbeat features. His writing has appeared in the Village Voice, the Miami Herald, and New York Newsday, and he's appeared as a guest on Countdown with Keith Olbermann.

One investigative piece succeeded in getting Larry Harmon's version of Bozo the Clown thrown out of the International Clown Hall of Fame, after he proved that Harmon had falsely described himself as the original Bozo. Wolf was part of the 2001 Peabody Award-winning team at ABC News that covered the September 11 attacks.

At ABCNEWS.com from 1997 to 2007, Wolf was entertainment producer and author of The Wolf Files, a weekly pop culture report that was also featured on ABC radio stations across the country.

A collection of his work at ABC, The Wolf Files: Adventures in Weird News, was published in 2003 by Globe Pequot Press.

In 2009, Wolf launched the Weird News section at AOL News. After AOL purchased the Huffington Post in 2011, Wolf and his core reporters formed HuffPost Weird News. Wolf is also the executive editor of Huffpost Crime.

In 2014, Wolf won a Shorty Award in the Weird Category. It was presented by Andrew W.K.

Wolf, a native of Great Neck, New York, began his writing career working for Generation magazine at the State University of New York at Buffalo in 1984.
