= Seventh generation =

Seventh generation can refer to:

- Seven generation sustainability, the idea that decisions should be considered for their impact on the seventh generation to come, inspired by the laws of the Iroquois
- Seventh Generation Inc., a Vermont-based manufacturer of cleaning products, a subsidiary of Unilever since 2016
- Seventh generation of video game consoles, a previous generation of video games containing the Xbox 360, Nintendo DS, Wii, PlayStation Portable, and PlayStation 3
- 7th Generation, a children's publishing imprint with Native American subjects owned by Book Publishing Company

== See also ==
- Generation (disambiguation)
