= Generate =

Generate may refer to:

- Creation (disambiguation)

Science and mathematics:

- Generate and test (trial and error)
- Generating function (math)
- Generating function (physics)
- Generating set
- Generating set of a group
- Generating trigonometric tables
- Generating a curve
- Generating a surface (mathematics)
- Generation of primes
- Generator (mathematics)

Other:

- Generated collection, in music theory
- Generate LA-NY, digital entertainment studio
- "Generate", a song by Collective Soul
- "Generate", a song by Eric Prydz

== See also ==
- Generating (disambiguation)
- Generation (disambiguation)
- Generative (disambiguation)
- Generator (disambiguation)
- Gene (disambiguation)
