= Generative =

Generative may refer to:

- Generative art, art that has been created using an autonomous system that is frequently, but not necessarily, implemented using a computer
- Generative design, form finding process that can mimic nature’s evolutionary approach to design
- Generative music, music that is ever-different and changing, and that is created by a system

Mathematics and science

- Generative anthropology, a field of study based on the theory that history of human culture is a genetic or "generative" development stemming from the development of language
- Generative model, a model for randomly generating observable data in probability and statistics
- Generative AI, a type of machine learning system that uses generative models
- Generative programming, a type of computer programming in which some mechanism generates a computer program to allow human programmers write code at a higher abstraction level
- Generative sciences, an interdisciplinary and multidisciplinary science that explores the natural world and its complex behaviours as a generative process
- Generative systems, systems that use a few basic rules to yield patterns which can be extremely varied and unpredictable

Language

- Generative grammar, an approach to theoretical linguistics based on sets of rules that generate grammatically correct sentences
- Generative lexicon, a theory of semantics which focuses on the distributed nature of compositionality in natural language
- Generative metrics, theories of verse structure based on generative linguistic ideas
- Generative semantics, an approach developed from transformational generative grammar that assumes that deep structures are the sole input to semantic interpretation

== See also ==
- Generate (disambiguation)
