= Fourth generation =

Fourth generation may refer to:

- 4G, the fourth generation of cellular wireless standards
- Fourth-generation programming language
- Fourth-generation jet fighter
- Fourth generation warfare, conflict characterized by a blurring of the lines between war and politics, soldier and civilian
- Generation IV reactor, a set of theoretical nuclear reactor designs
- History of video game consoles (fourth generation) (1987–1999)
- Yonsei (Japanese diaspora), great-grandchildren of Japanese-born emigrants
- A group of Pokémon, see List of generation IV Pokémon

== See also ==
- Generation (disambiguation)
