= 21st Century Boy =

1986 single by Sigue Sigue Sputnik

Single by Sigue Sigue Sputnik

from the album Flaunt It
- B-side: "Buy EMI"
- Released: 26 May 1986
- Genre: Rock; new wave
- Length: 5:10 (album version); 4:11 (single version); 3:32 (radio edit)
- Label: Parlophone
- Songwriter(s): Anthony James; Martin Degville; Neal Whitmore
- Producer(s): Giorgio Moroder

Sigue Sigue Sputnik singles chronology
"Love Missile F1-11" (1986)	"21st Century Boy" (1986)	"Sex Bomb Boogie" (1986)

"21st Century Boy" is a song by the British new wave band Sigue Sigue Sputnik, released in May 1986 and is the second single from their debut studio album Flaunt It. It was the band's second biggest hit, peaking at number 20 on the UK Singles Chart.

== Composition and lyrics ==
As indicated by the title, the lyrics of the song contain references to the then-future 21st century. The title itself is possibly a take on the T. Rex song "20th Century Boy". The song begins with a sample of Johann Sebastian Bach's "Toccata and Fugue in D minor". Capitalism and technology are themes of the song with the companies Cartier, Tissot, Timex, Coca-Cola and Fender all mentioned. Countries such as China, Singapore and El Salvador are also mentioned with the implication that they are all wealthy countries in the 21st century. Another theme, common in the 1980s, is dystopian future with the idea of living on Saturn or Venus and of 'sex machines' and 'sci-fi sex' and the lyric 'I am the ultimate product' reinforcing this. The lyric 'ladies and gentlemen, Elvis 1990' (apart from possibly alluding to the sex symbol status of Elvis Presley) refers to Tony James' bass guitar, which he describes, "I painted the words Elvis 1990 on the guitar and the legendary 'space bass' was born".

== Critical reception ==
Reviewing for Record Mirror, Eleanor Levy wrote, "this record's already been reviewed. Then, of course, it was called 'Love Missile F1-11' and the joke gets less funny every time you hear it. They've changed the title, of course, but you can't fool all of the people that easily, you know boys. Actually, it's a far better guitar riff on this (that is the only difference), but it's too late to be greeted with anything but indifference". In the September 1986 issue of Spin, "21 Century Boy" is also described as sounding "suspiciously like 'Love Missile F1-11', with a campy apocalyptic feel and a missed opportunity for Jetsons references." With the single failing to follow its predecessor into the UK top 10, founding band member Tony James blamed the track's relative underperformance on consumer backlash as a result of saturation coverage of the band in the British press at the time.

== Music video ==
The music video opens with a helicopter flying over an urban area at night and follows with some short video cuts of a neon-soaked Ginza in Tokyo. Sigue Sigue Sputnik members then exit a limousine and enter a luxurious and 'futuristic' hotel. They are also featured in a helicopter going towards a concert. There are also several similarities to the film Blade Runner (1982) in the video. Obviously, in the video there are some now very anachronistic items, including brick mobile phones and a Discman. The video was directed by Hugh Symmonds and was described in Music & Media as "basically a continuation of S.S. Sputnik's last single, with a backdrop from Japan and the US".

== Formats and track listings ==
7": Parlophone / SSS 2 (UK)

1. "21st Century Boy" – 4:11
2. "Buy EMI" – 3:53

7": Parlophone / SSS 2 (UK) (Original Recalled Release)

1. "21st Century Boy" – 3:32
2. "Buy EMI" – 3:53

7": Parlophone / 1C 006 20 1258 7 (Germany)

1. "21st Century Boy" – 3:32
2. "Buy EMI" – 3:52

12": Parlophone / 12 SSS 2 (UK)

1. "21st Century Boy" (T.V. Mix) – 6:09
2. "Buy EMI" (£4,000,000 Mix) – 7:24

12": Parlophone / 1C K 060-20 1361 6 (Germany)

1. "21st Century Boy" (German Mix) – 5:58
2. "21st Century Boy" (Dance Mix) – 5:24

12" Promo: Parlophone / 12 SSSDJ 2 (UK)

1. "21st Century Boy" (T.V. Mix) – 6:00
2. "21st Century Boy" (Dance Mix) – 5:15
3. "21st Century Boy" (7" Mix) – 3:28

== Charts ==
Chart (1986)	Peak position
Finland (Suomen virallinen lista)	4
Germany (GfK)	28
Ireland (IRMA)	16
Portugal (AFP)	20
Spain (AFYVE)	6
Switzerland (Schweizer Hitparade)	24
UK Singles (OCC)	20
