= Mark III =

Mark III or Mark 3 often refers to the third version of a product, frequently military hardware. "Mark", meaning "model" or "variant", can be abbreviated "Mk."

Mark III or Mark 3 may refer to:

== Arts and entertainment ==
- Mark III line-up of rock band Deep Purple, the band's third line-up, with David Coverdale, Ritchie Blackmore, Jon Lord, Glenn Hughes and Ian Paice
- Mk III: The Final Concerts, a 1975 concert album by Deep Purple
- Emergency Medical Hologram Mark III, a character on the television series Star Trek: Voyager
- Mark III, a fictional cybernetic tank in the game Ogre
- Mark III Flying Car, a fictional vehicle driven by Danger Mouse
- Cobra Mk III, a spaceship in the computer game Elite
- MK III, a 2013 album by Steam Powered Giraffe

== Technology ==
=== Military and weaponry ===
- Mark III, a variant of the British Mark I tank
- Mark III, an alternate name for the Fat Man atomic bomb used on Nagasaki, in use until 1949
- Supermarine Spitfire Mk III; a single 1940 British fighter aircraft pre-production prototype
- Mk III Turtle helmet (1944); British Army helmet that first saw action in the Normandy Landings
- Merkava Mark 3 (1989); battle tank of Israel Defense Forces
- Ruger MK III (2004), an American handgun

=== Other vehicles ===
- Geosynchronous Satellite Launch Vehicle Mark III, a launch vehicle
- Aston Martin DB Mark III (1957–1959), a British luxury sports car
- AC Cobra MkIII (aka Shelby Cobra), an American-engined British sports car produced intermittently since 1962
  - Superformance MkIII, a mass-produced replica of the AC Cobra MkIII
- Continental Mark III (1958, 1969–1971), an American personal luxury car
- British Rail Mark 3 (1976); a rail carriage design for high-speed and regular service
- Kolb Mark III ultralight aircraft
- Cooper Mark III, a Formula Three racing car

=== Other technologies ===
- Mark III (radio telescope), a radio telescope in England, constructed in 1966
- Mark III (space suit), a NASA space suit prototype
- Mark III containment design, a third generation General Electric BWR-6 boiling water nuclear reactor design
- Camera models:
  - Canon EOS-1D Mark III
  - Canon EOS-1Ds Mark III
- Harvard Mark III, an early computer built at Harvard University and used by the US Navy
- Mesa Boogie Mark III, an electric guitar amplifier
- Sega Mark III, the original Japanese branding of Sega Master System, a video game console
- Vox Mark III, a teardrop-shaped electric guitar of the 1960s

== Religion ==
- Mark 3 or Mark III, the third chapter of the Gospel of Mark in the New Testament of the Christian Bible
- Pope Mark III of Alexandria, patriarch of the Coptic Church from 1116 to 1189

== See also ==
- Third generation (disambiguation)
