= Second generation =

Second generation or variants may refer to:

- Second generation immigrant
  - Nisei, one of the second generation of people of Japanese descent in the Americas
- Second generation of Chinese leaders, see Generations of Chinese leadership
- Second-generation human rights, see Three generations of human rights
- People whose parents took part in a Blessing ceremony of the Unification Church

== Arts and entertainment ==
- Second Generation (novel), 1964 novel, by Raymond Williams
- Second Generation, 1978 novel by Howard Fast
- The Second Generation, 1994 collection of five fantasy novellas by Margaret Weis and Tracy Hickman
- Second Generation (film), 2003 British television drama
- Second Generation (advertisement), 2006 television ad for Nike
- Second Generation of Postwar Writers in Japanese literature
- Transformers: Generation 2, toy line which ran from 1992–1995
- In Pokémon, see List of generation II Pokémon

== Science and technology ==
- 2G, second-generation wireless telephone technology
- List of second-generation mathematicians
- List of second-generation physicists
- Second generation computer, a computer constructed using discrete transistors
- Second generation of video game consoles (1976–1984), sometimes referred to as the early 8-bit era
- Second Generation Multiplex Plus, DNA profiling system
- Second-generation programming language, a generational way to categorise assembly languages
- Second-generation warfare, the tactics of warfare used after the invention of the rifled musket and breech-loading weapons
- Second-generation wavelet transform, in signal processing
- Transperth Second Generation A-series train; see Transperth A-series train
- Generation II reactor, a category of nuclear power reactor that includes many of those still in operation
- EPC Gen2, a standard for Radio-frequency identification

== Sport ==
- List of second-generation Major League Baseball players
- List of second-generation National Basketball Association players
- List of second-generation National Football League players
- Generation 2 (NASCAR), generation of cars 1967–1980

== See also ==
- Generation (disambiguation)
- First generation (disambiguation)
- Third generation (disambiguation)
- Mark II (disambiguation)
