= Dress for Excess =

Studio album by Sigue Sigue Sputnik
- Released: December 1988
- Recorded: 1987–1988
- Genre: Synth-pop; dance-pop; glam rock; electronic
- Length: 42:57
- Label: Parlophone (Europe); EMI America (USA)
- Producer: Stephen Hague; Neal X; Stock Aitken Waterman; Liminha

Sigue Sigue Sputnik chronology
Flaunt It (1986)	Dress for Excess (1988)	The First Generation (1990)

Singles from Dress for Excess
- 1. "Success" Released: 7 November 1988; 2. "Dancerama" Released: 13 March 1989; 3. "Albinoni vs Star Wars" Released: 8 May 1989; 4. "Rio Rocks" Released: 31 July 1989

Professional ratings
Review scores
Source	Rating
Allmusic	3/5 stars
Record Mirror	1/5 stars
Smash Hits	3/10

Dress for Excess is the second studio album by British band Sigue Sigue Sputnik, released in December 1988 in Brazil and in April 1989 in the UK and US.

== Release ==
The album was released in Brazil before anywhere else, to make way for the band's Brazilian tour. The first single released from the album was "Success" and was produced by Stock Aitken Waterman. It became the most successful single from the album, peaking at number 31 on the UK Singles Chart. The music video for the single featured a number of famous people saying the word "Success". "Dancerama" peaked at number 50 on the Singles Chart. The video was filmed in Paris and was based on the sci-fi film La Jetée.

The song, "Albinoni vs Star Wars" is a version of "Adagio in G Minor" (attributed to Tomaso Albinoni), which Tony James originally retitled "Tarzan vs. IBM". However, both brand names were copyrighted, so he changed the name to "Albinoni vs. Star Wars". The single peaked at number 75 in the UK. The final single, "Rio Rocks" was produced by Brazilian Liminha and was based on "La Bamba".

== Reception ==
Reviewing the album for Record Mirror, David Giles wrote: "The Sputnik language is littered with buzz words – 'star wars', 'satellite', 'dance', 'sex', 'Rio', 'future'. These are intended to act as signifiers for the images that they wish to convey. 'Star Wars' is supposed to make you think of the space age, and the fact that the band are so terribly modern. 'Rio' conjures up the image of Latin America riots, thus lending the lyrics a 'current affairs' angle... but the Big One, SSS's raison d'être, is SEX. SEX SEX SEX, they should have called themselves. That's what it all boils down to, the idea that all women want their bodies".

Reviewing for Smash Hits, Carol Irving described the album as "such a mish mash of echoey spook noises that, far from being the future of rock 'n' roll, if you took all the blips and bleeps away, you'd be left with some terrible, old fashioned rock 'n' roll."

Billboard review: "Cover legend, "This Time It's Music," on SSS' second album is almost laughable; while silly hype that surrounded band's 1986 debut has dissipated (no commercial space for sale this time), music remains in short supply as well. Standard dance-pop stuff won't move anybody; even the S/A/W-produced single, "Success," is sub-Kylie Minogue material."

== Track listing ==
All tracks are written by Martin Degville, Tony James and Neal Whitmore, except where noted.

No.	Title	Writer(s)	Producer(s)	Length
1.	"Albinoni vs Star Wars Parts 1 & 2"	Degville, James, Whitmore, Stephen Hague	Hague (part 1), Whitmore (part 2)	4:37
2.	"Boom Boom Satellite"		Whitmore	4:23
3.	"Hey Jayne Mansfield Superstar!"		Liminha	4:29
4.	"Super Crook Blues"		Whitmore	4:00
5.	"Rio Rocks!"		Liminha	5:18
6.	"Success"		Stock Aitken Waterman	3:50
7.	"Dancerama"		Whitmore	4:45
8.	"Orgasm"		Whitmore	3:27
9.	"M*A*D (Mutal Assured Destruction)"		Whitmore	5:32
10.	"Is This the Future!"		Whitmore	2:36
Total length:				42:57

Track 5, "Rio Rocks!", contains a sample of Tony Montana (Al Pacino) saying "Go ahead, Romeo" from the 1983 movie Scarface. The band Boom Boom Satellites named themselves after the second song on the album.

== Personnel ==
Musicians

- Martin Degville – vocals
- Tony James – "space" guitar
- Neal X – guitar
- Miss Yana Ya Ya (Jane Farrimond) – keyboards, effects
- Chris Kavanagh – drums
- Ray Mayhew – drums
- Bill Mitchell – "all deep vocals"
- Sylvia Mason-James – backing vocals

Technical

- Stephen Hague – producer (1)
- Neal X – engineer, producer (1, 2, 4, 7–10)
- Liminha – producer (3, 5)
- Mike Stock – producer (6)
- Matt Aitken – producer (6)
- Pete Waterman – producer (6)
- Gordon Bonner – mixing engineer (10)
- Phil Harding – mixing (6)
- Gary Langan – mixing (3, 5)
- Stephen Taylor – mixing engineer (1, 2, 4, 7–9)
- Ian Ross – art direction, design
- Bill Smith – art direction, design
- Tony James – marketing, design, photo concepts
- Johnny Rozsa – photography

== Charts ==
Chart (1989)	Peak position
Finnish Albums (Suomen virallinen lista)	35
UK Albums (OCC)	53
