= Generator =

Generator may refer to:

- Signal generator, electronic devices that generate repeating or non-repeating electronic signals
- Electric generator, a device that converts mechanical energy to electrical energy.
- Tidal stream generator, a machine that extracts energy from moving masses of water
- Generator (circuit theory), an element in an abstract circuit providing a source of electricity
- Engine-generator, an electric generator with its own engine
- Wearable generator, a hypothetical generator that can be worn on the human body
- Gas generator a device, often similar to a solid rocket or a liquid rocket that burns to produce large volumes of relatively cool gas
- Motor–generator, a device for converting electrical power to another form
- Atmospheric water generator, a device capable of extracting water from air

== Mathematics ==
- Generator (mathematics)
- Generator matrix, a matrix used in coding theory
- Generator (category theory) of a category, in category mathematics
- Generating set of a group, group generators in abstract algebra
- Generating set of a module, module generators in abstract algebra
- Infinitesimal generator (stochastic processes), in stochastic analysis

== Computing ==
- Application generator, software that generates application programs from descriptions of the problem rather than by traditional programming
- Generator (computer programming), a routine that acts like an iterator
- Pseudorandom number generator, a producer of random numbers
- Code generator, part of a compiler
- Natural-language generator, generating natural language from a machine representation system such as a knowledge base or a logical form
- Random test generator, used in software testing

== Music ==
- The Generators, a 1997 punk rock band from Los Angeles
- Kix (band), an American glam metal band also known as The Generators
- Generator (Bad Religion album), 1992, and the album's opening track
- Generator (Aborym album), 2006
- Generators (album), a 2012 album by Keith Fullerton Whitman
- "Generator" (Foo Fighters song), 2000
- "Generator" (The Holloways song), 2006
- "Generator", a 2015 song by Doomtree from All Hands
- "Generator", a 1995 song by Elastica from The Menace
- "Generator", a 2007 song by Minipop from A New Hope
- "Generator", a 2017 song by Turnstile from Time & Space
- "Generator", a 2024 song by Justice from their album, Hyperdrama
- Tuning generator

== Politics ==
- Generator Collective, American campaign group

== See also ==
- Gener8tor, an American venture capital firm
- Generation (disambiguation)
- Generate (disambiguation)
- Regenerative heat exchanger
