= Sixth generation =

Sixth generation may refer to:

- Sixth Generation (film movement) (1990—), in Chinese cinema
- Sixth-generation fighter, a speculated generation of fighter aircraft expected to enter service around 2025–2030
- Sixth generation of video game consoles (1998-2013)
- The Sixth Generation (band), an American rock band
- Generation 6 (NASCAR), cars used in NASCAR since 2013
- A group of Pokémon, see List of generation VI Pokémon

== See also ==
- Generation (disambiguation)
