= Wearable generator =

Hypothetical technology involving nanoelectronics and alternative medicine

A wearable generator is an article of clothing that contains some form of electrical generation system built in. The concept encompasses a variety of generation systems intended to supply small amounts of power to keep portable electronics in a good state of charge through natural motions of the body.

== Summary ==
There are many great projects related to wearable technology or wearable power generation. One concept, for example, is an article of clothing that has the ability to convert the movements of the wearer into electricity using nano-ion pumps. It is based on nanotechnology and has the ability to generate electricity for the purposes of building muscle mass and improving coordination. Emergency workers like firemen and paramedics could use chest-implanted sensors to create a floor plan of unfamiliar buildings; making a rookie perform his job as efficiently as a veteran. With cameras becoming cheaper and smaller, wearable generators may also serve as a quick method to recharge the batteries on those devices. The environmental burden of disposing used batteries has contributed to e-waste; something that wearable generators may drastically reduce. Enough energy can theoretically be harnessed from a person's body heat to power a smartphone or tablet.

== Energy sources ==
=== Thermoelectric energy ===
Thermoelectric generators may transform the body's heat into electric energy. This is the most reliable and stable source of energy when creating wearable generators, as the human body temperature is constant it produces a consistent source of energy, as does the capacity of thermoelectric generators to constantly capture energy in spite of the human condition or position.

Traditional thermoelectric generators are inflexible and brittle, making them unsuitable for complicated human body parts. However, a recent study has taken on this challenge and discovered a way of modifying thermoelectric generators in order to adapt to the human body, making them more comfortable to wear. The first self-healing and recyclable thermoelectric generator system with improved stretchability and thermoelectric performance was the product of this research. The technique produces a record-high open-circuit voltage and allows customers to tailor the device to specific thermal and mechanical conditions. High-performance modular thermoelectric chips, dynamic covalent thermoset polyimine, and flowable liquid metal are all used in the system. In addition, to improve thermoelectric performance under sun irradiation, a wavelength-selective metamaterial layer is applied to the cold side of the thermoelectric generator, which is vital for harvesting energy during outdoor activities.

=== Chemical energy ===
Chemical energy in the human body acts as an energy source for biofuels cells, which use microbes to convert chemical energy into electrical energy. However, its output power density is insufficient to provide sufficient energy to maintain an electric device operating. As a result, a hybrid energy system was integrated into it in order to provide a stable energy source.

=== Mechanical energy ===
Triboelectric, piezoelectric, and electromagnetic energy harvesters facilitate the collection of mechanical energy from human movements which is then converted to electrical energy.
