= The First Generation =

Compilation album by Sigue Sigue Sputnik
- Released: 1990
- Recorded: 1984–1990
- Genres: Post-punk, new wave, glam rock
- Length: 53:07
- Label: Jungle Records

Sigue Sigue Sputnik chronology
Dress for Excess (1988)	The First Generation (1990)	The First Generation - Second Edition (1997)

Professional ratings
Review scores
Source	Rating
Allmusic	4/5 stars

The First Generation is a compilation album by the British band Sigue Sigue Sputnik, released in 1990 (see 1990 in music).

== Track listing ==
1. "Rockit Miss USA (Black and Bluski)" - 6:57
2. "Sex Bomb Boogie (Tick Tock and Boom!)" - 4:07
3. "21st Century Boy (TV Messiah)" - 3:59
4. "Teenage Thunder (Teenage Mutants)" - 4:53
5. "She's My Man (She Wolves of the S.S.S)" - 4:57
6. "Love Missile F1-11 (A Clockwork Sputnik)" - 4:54
7. "Jayne Mansfield (Blitzkrieg Baby)" - 4:05
8. "Ultra Violence (Senseless Sex and Gratuitous Violence)" - 5:43
9. "Krush Groove Girls (The Meat Hookers of Love)" - 4:23
10. "Rockajet Baby (This Stuff'll Kill Ya)" - 4:27
11. "Rebel Rebel (Zigger Zagger)" (live) David Bowie song- 4:35
