= Third generation =

Third generation, Generation III, Gen 3 or Gen III may refer to:

- Third Generation (album), a 1982 album by Hiroshima
- The Third Generation (1920 film), an American drama film directed by Henry Kolker
- The Third Generation (1979 film), a West German black comedy by Rainer Werner Fassbinder
- The Third Generation (2009 film), a Nepalese documentary by Manoj Bhusal
- Generation III reactor, a class of nuclear reactor
- A group of Pokémon, see List of generation III Pokémon
- List of early third generation computers
- Gen 3, an EP by Origami Angel

== See also ==
- 3G, third-generation mobile telecommunications
- Third-generation programming language
- History of video game consoles (third generation) (1983–1995)
- Sansei, grandchildren of Japanese-born emigrants
- Mark III (disambiguation)
- Second generation (disambiguation)
