= Flaunt It (album) =

Studio album by Sigue Sigue Sputnik
- Released: 28 July 1986
- Studios: Westside (London); Abbey Road (London); Sputnik City
- Genres: Synth-pop; new wave; glam punk; synthpunk
- Length: 41:48
- Label: Parlophone
- Producer: Giorgio Moroder

Sigue Sigue Sputnik chronology
Flaunt It (1986)	Dress for Excess (1988)

Singles from Flaunt It
- 1. "Love Missile F1-11" Released: 17 February 1986; 2. "21st Century Boy" Released: 26 May 1986; 3. "Sex Bomb Boogie" Released: September 1986; 4. "Rockit Miss U.S.A." / "Teenage Thunder" Released: October 1986; 5. "Massive Retaliation" Released: November 1986

Professional ratings
Review scores
Source	Rating
AllMusic	4.5/5 stars
Number One	2/5 stars
Record Mirror	3/5 stars
Smash Hits	£££££££/10

Flaunt It is the debut studio album by the British new wave band Sigue Sigue Sputnik, released on 28 July 1986 by Parlophone. The album featured remixes of their hit singles "Love Missile F1-11" and "21st Century Boy" and peaked at number 10 on the UK Albums Chart.

== Adverts ==
Flaunt It was unique in that the band sold spots between songs for advertisements. Ultimately, ads for L'Oréal, i-D magazine, the short-lived London pirate television station Network 21, and London's Kensington Market clothing shop Pure Sex were complemented by fictitious ads for the Sputnik Corporation and the (unreleased) Sigue Sigue Sputnik Computer Game; a spoken word advertisement (narrated by the Sputnik Corporation voiceover) for EMI closes the album. All original CD versions and the version released in Germany also include an ad for Tempo, a lifestyle magazine. The liner notes include small print ads for the various advertisers, as well.

Originally, the album was going to feature eight different adverts for the UK, US and Japan releases. However, band member Tony James was unable to secure different adverts, so the releases in the US and Japan featured the same adverts as the UK version. The eight adverts lasted up to 30 seconds long and reportedly each cost $1,500. Before the album's release, James said "We could earn $150,000 before we sell a single copy. Ultimately, the profits could be used to reduce the price of records".

== Release ==
The first 20,000 copies of Flaunt It were released in a special edition box, based on Japanese toy robot packaging, and came with a 12-page booklet.

Several singles were released from the album. Their debut single, "Love Missile F1-11" was a Top-10 hit in numerous countries, including the UK, where it peaked at number 3 on the UK singles chart, and Spain where it topped the charts. The subsequent single "21st Century Boy" did not achieve the same amount of success, peaking at number 20 in the UK.

There was a lot of pressure to release "Atari Baby" as the third single. However, James refused as he wanted "Sex Bomb Boogie" released as "the third in the trilogy". Also James' idea was to release "Sex Bomb Boogie" as a video-only single in the UK, which made it ineligible to chart. The video featured footage from the James Cameron science fiction action film The Terminator (1984). The single, however, was released in Germany, but failed to chart. Sigue Sigue Sputnik decided to release the double A-sided single "Rockit Miss U.S.A."/"Teenage Thunder" under the pseudonym 'Sci-Fi Sex Stars' on their short-lived label 'Who M I?'. It was a limited release of 1000 copies and featured different mixes of the two songs compared to their album versions. The final single, "Massive Retaliation", was only released in the US.

On 9 October 2020, Cherry Red Records reissued this album in a 4CD deluxe edition featuring remixes, B-sides and unreleased material, including a live performance recorded at Abbey Road Studios. The content was remastered with input from James and fellow band member Neal X.

== Critical reception ==
The album was slated by the British press and critical reaction was negative. Reviewing for Record Mirror, Roger Morton wrote that "it was a mistake to put out 'the album' at all" and that "somebody should have told Giorgio Moroder what a wild, writhing sex flash this was supposed to be, because most of it sounds pretty tame." He concluded that it "doesn't mean it's a dead horse that Tony's flaunting, but the tired old rock'n'roll nag is bound to limp a bit under the weight of all that techno-junk clutter and global domination boasting."

Reviewing for Smash Hits, Tom Hibbert wrote that "apart from one attempt at "atmospherics", "Atari Baby", the whole thing proceeds at an identical pace and similar jerky level and, once you've got the joke, it's really quite enjoyable: not as good as Adam Ant but a birrovalaff anyway – even if you do know that it'll all sound horrendously dated by this time next year."

Anthony Naughton for Number One wrote that the band "seem to be caught in a Dan Dare time warp, and regard space, violence and sex as being fundamental features in life (unlike Dan Dare)" and that "the bubble hasn't burst yet, it's just let out a little wind."

== Track listing ==
All tracks are written by Tony James, Martin Degville and Neal Whitmore, except where noted.

Side one
No.	Title	Writer(s)	Length
1.	"Love Missile F1-11" (Re-Recording Part II)		4:49
2.	"Atari Baby"	James; Degville; Whitmore; Giorgio Moroder	4:57
3.	"Sex-Bomb-Boogie"		4:48
4.	"Rockit Miss U.S.A."		6:08

Side two
No.	Title	Writer(s)	Length
5.	"21st Century Boy"		5:10
6.	"Massive Retaliation"	James; Degville; Whitmore; Moroder	5:02
7.	"Teenage Thunder"		5:17
8.	"She's My Man"		5:37
Total length:			41:48

- On download and streaming services, "Love Missile F1-11" is the 7-inch single version with a duration of 3:44.

=== 2020 deluxe edition ===
Flaunt It + bonus track
No.	Title	Writer(s)	Length
1.	"Love Missile F1-11" (Re-Recording Part II)		4:29
2.	"Atari Baby"	James; Degville; Whitmore; Moroder	4:34
3.	"Sex Bomb Boogie"		4:35
4.	"Rockit Miss U.S.A"		5:35
5.	"The Sputnik Corporation" (Advertisement)		0:33
6.	"21st Century Boy"		4:40
7.	"Massive Retaliation"	James; Degville; Whitmore; Moroder	4:42
8.	"The Sigue Sigue Sputnik Computer Game" (Advertisement)		0:21
9.	"Teenage Thunder"		4:52
10.	"She's My Man"		5:22
11.	"EMI Records" (Advertisement)		0:18
12.	"From the Gutter to the Stars"		12:57

Remixes
No.	Title	Writer(s)	Length
1.	"Trailer Mix"		1:14
2.	"Love Missile F1-11" (7" Single Mix)		3:35
3.	"Love Missile F1-11" (The Bangkok Remix)		6:01
4.	"Love Missile F1-11" (Dance Mix)		4:29
5.	"Love Missile F1-11" (Extended Ultra Violence Version)		6:58
6.	"Love Missile F1-11" (Video Mix)		3:48
7.	"Love Missile F1-11" (Japanese Remix)		6:29
8.	"Love Missile F1-11" (WestBam Remix Short Version)		3:29
9.	"Massive Retaliation" (The Super Massive UK Remix)	James; Degville; Whitmore; Moroder	5:44
10.	"Massive Retaliation" (Shut Up Dub Remix)	James; Degville; Whitmore; Moroder	3:44
11.	"Sex Bomb Boogie" (Magic Flute)		3:32
12.	"Sex Bomb Dance"		4:23

Remixes, Rarities and B-sides
No.	Title	Length
1.	"Hack Attack"	3:53
2.	"Buy EMI"	3:55
3.	"Dancerama" (1986 Version)	4:27
4.	"Suicide" (Live in London Sept '86)	5:16
5.	"21st Century Boy" (Extended T.V. Mix)	6:11
6.	"21st Century Boy" (German Remix)	6:01
7.	"21st Century Boy" (Dance Mix)	5:28
8.	"Buy EMI" (£4,000,000 Mix)	7:26
9.	"She's My Man" (Remix)	5:11

Live at Abbey Road
No.	Title	Writer(s)	Length
1.	"Sex Bomb Boogie"		8:09
2.	"21st Century Boy"		5:40
3.	"Twist & Shout"	Bert Berns; Phil Medley	5:24
4.	"She's My Man"		7:09
5.	"Shoot It Up"		5:42
6.	"Jayne Mansfield"		8:31
7.	"Rockit Miss U.S.A."		3:46

== Personnel ==
Sigue Sigue Sputnik

- Martin Degville – vocals
- Tony James – synth guitar
- Neal X – electric guitar
- Ray Mayhew – drums
- Chris Kavanagh – drums
- Miss Yana Ya Ya (Jane Farrimond) – special effects

Technical

- Giorgio Moroder – producer
- Brian Reeves – engineer
- Syd Brak – illustrations
- Mike Morton – photography
- Joe Shutter – photography
- Frank Griffin – photography
- Dave Thompson – liner notes
- Brian Carr – legal counsel

== Popular culture ==
"Love Missile F1-11" was used in the American teen comedy film Ferris Bueller's Day Off (1986) and the video game Grand Theft Auto: Vice City (2002). A version of the song is featured in the South Park episode "Super Fun Time", with Eric Cartman singing along "I'm having a super fun time". The song also features on the trailer for the American crime comedy film Stretch (2014).

Pop Will Eat Itself released a cover version of "Love Missile F1-11" as a single in May 1987, before including it on their debut studio album Box Frenzy in 1988. David Bowie covered the song as an outtake during the sessions for his twenty-fourth studio album, Reality (2003). It was then released as a B-side for the single "New Killer Star".

The robot depicted on Syd Brak's cover art was ranked as the 17th best robot of all time on the January 18th, 2017 episode of The Best Show with Tom Scharpling.

== Charts ==
Chart (1986)	Peak position
Australian Albums (Kent Music Report)	70
Austrian Albums (Ö3 Austria)	16
Canada Top Albums/CDs (RPM)	94
Finnish Albums (Suomen virallinen lista)	4
German Albums (Offizielle Top 100)	33
Icelandic Albums (Dagblaðið Vísir)	8
Dutch Albums (Album Top 100)	58
New Zealand Albums (RMNZ)	16
Swedish Albums (Sverigetopplistan)	29
UK Albums (Official Charts)	10
US Billboard 200	96
