= Syd Brak =

South African artist

Syd Brak was a London-based illustrator. He is particularly recognized for his top selling poster Long Distance Kiss.

== Early career ==
In the mid-1970s, Syd was awarded the 'gold award' for design and illustration in Johannesburg South Africa by Bill Bernbach. In the late 1970s, Syd moved to London. He started working as a freelance airbrush artist. He has done work for companies including Coca-Cola, MSN, and Levi's.

== The Kiss series ==
The Kiss series that so inspired designer Martin Kidman was another big hit for Athena. Created by Syd Brak, an artist from an advertising background, it was planned specifically to appeal to teen and pre-teen girls who, Brak says, "aspire to maturity and sophistication". Pictures such as First Kiss, Forget Me Not and Long Distance Kiss all contained some mini- narrative that chimed with the adolescent psyche, hinting picturesquely at the dramas of teenage melancholy, lost love and heartache. The icy, mysterious girls, their faces bleached out, their eyes smothered in electric blue eye shadow and their lips a streak of glossy red, inspired many imitations with cheap make-up. They also apparently inspired last year's homage to the 1980s in The Face which featured on its cover a photograph of airbrush-style perfection. The same photographer, Sølve Sundsbø, followed it up with his recent ad campaign for hip design house Bottega Veneta - the collection, needless to say, inspired by 1980s style.

In 1982, his poster, Long Distance Kiss was the top selling poster in the world. It was sold in Athena art retail shops.

Syd Brak was one of the most influential artists of the 1980s, perfecting an airbrush technique that allowed him to create some of the most iconic images of that decade.

== Recent career ==
His retro style posters captured the new romantic / punk era of the late 70s early 80s. They have been sold by the hundreds of thousands. Syd did book covers for authors including John Grisham, Wilbur Smith and Ken Follett.
