= Generation (Canadian TV program) =

- Presented by: Lloyd Robertson; June Callwood; Katie Johnson; Bill McVean
- Country of origin: Canada
- Original language: English
- No. of seasons: 1

Production
- Producer: Claude Baikie
- Running time: 30 minutes

Original release
- Network: CBC Television
- Release: 4 August – 15 September 1965

Generation is a Canadian current affairs television program that aired on CBC Television in 1965.

== Premise ==
The program examined contemporary topics and concerns in the context of the generation gap. Issues such as careers, marriage, Quebec's Quiet Revolution, religion or tobacco were the subject of various episodes.

For most of its run, Generation was a local Toronto programme hosted by Lloyd Robertson. In mid-1965, it was broadcast nationally with selected local episodes supplemented by episodes produced from various regions. June Callwood, Katie Johnson and Bill McVean were additional hosts during the national broadcasts.

== Scheduling ==
The half-hour program aired locally on CBLT from late 1963 until mid-1966. It was broadcast on the national CBC network Wednesdays at 10:30 p.m. (Eastern) from 4 August to 15 September 1965.
