= Generation (Melbourne magazine) =

Generation, subtitled "a Journal of Australian Jewish Life, Thought and Community", was a Jewish magazine published quarterly in Melbourne, Australia, in the 1990s.

== History ==
The magazine was founded in 1990 by Alan Charak and Mark Joel, financially supported for much of its existence by Lyndi and Rodney Adler, the Pratt Foundation and others. Charak was its first editor, but shortly Dr Mark Baker, lecturer in Jewish history at Melbourne University, was appointed editor-in-chief.

Yvonne Fein, author of the roman à clef entitled The Torn Messiah, has been mentioned as an editor.

=== God on trial ===
Generation entered the public consciousness when it sponsored a mock "Trial of God", based on a play by Elie Wiesel, and held at the Hakoah Club on 16 July 1994. In the trial, God who was believed by Jews (and some Christians) to be willing and able to interfere in human history in defence of His People, was charged with dereliction during the Holocaust. Jacquie Seeman served as the "judge"; Peta Pellach as "prosecuting attorney", while witnesses included Rabbi Selwyn Franklin, Rebbetzin Jana Gottschall, humorist Sandy Gutman, Dr Bill Leadbetter, Dr Rachael Kohn and David Benedikt. The proceedings were broadcast on Radio National.

=== A "new start" ===
The magazine was given a new start in production values, by Lesa-Belle Furhagen and Terraplane Press, who took over its publication in 1998. She was determined to rid the magazine of its intellectual, Orthodox, Melbourne-centric, reputation. Furhagen and her associate Toby Creswell expanded its reach from subscription-only to newsagencies and stationery shops.

The magazine's benefactors called a halt to their support with the last issue of 2000.

The National Library of Australia holds an incomplete collection of issues: Vol. I, No. 2 – Vol. IV; No. 4, Vol. V, No. 3; Vol VI, No. 4 – Vol. VIII, No. 4.
