= Generation (New York magazine) =

Generation Magazine
- Type: Fortnightly magazine
- Format: Magazine
- Owner: Sub Board I, Incorporated
- Founded: 1984
- Headquarters: Buffalo, New York, New York, U.S.
- Circulation: 5,000

Generation is a student publication that operated out of the State University of New York at Buffalo in Buffalo, New York. Founded in 1984 by Eric Francis Coppolino, at first it was a fortnightly magazine with wide-ranging news, arts, literary and sports features concerning both campus and community events and issues. It later became a weekly magazine. Before September 2009, Generation Magazine was a weekly magazine predominantly featuring news, multimedia review, and literary articles.

Beginning in its first year, Generation received numerous awards in the Columbia Scholastic Journalism Competition.

The publication maintains a history of producing eleven issues per academic semester which are distributed throughout the greater Buffalo area as well as across campus. All staff members are currently undergraduate students, contributing to its self-proclaimed title as "The Student Voice Since 1984." However, the magazine traces its lineage back to the 1960s, and is the longest surviving and most successful in a series of student magazines on the campus.

Generation's immediate predecessor was The Current, which lost its funding and offices after illegally attempting to impeach Coppolino, then its managing editor, for publishing a satire on a conservative campus publication.

Generation has strict freedom of speech accommodations in its charter, which was written by Coppolino in the aftermath of The Current incident. Generation's content is uncensored, often featuring crude language and humor in editorials and columns. In the past, its content included investigative features, news content, and feature stories. The magazine has always had an activist or advocacy journalism slant.

Generation's weekly press run was 5,000 copies per issues over the 22 issues volume. It advertises itself as one of the largest student-run magazine on the East Coast of the United States. Before September 2009, the Generation printed 10,000 copies per issue over 30 issues.

The publication's marked its widest circulation in the late 1990's as it was distributed off campus, throughout the Buffalo area, as popularity increased due to its satirical and controversial content. Editor-in-Chief Dave Sikora along with editors Rick Kleinsmith, Dave Cedeno, Evan Robb, Al "Chainsaw" Cereda and Ken Barnes were among its most published contributors during this period.

The publication has also been involved in creating many auxiliary projects, including Reach, the campus student handbook for many years.

It was published by [Sub-Board I, Inc.], the now-defunct not-for-profit student services corporation at the university. Sub Board provided some funding and a business structure for the magazine.

== Generation on hiatus ==
At the end of the fall semester in 2008, Sub Board I, Inc. decided to pull Generation's charter. Sub Board then elected a new editor in chief. Generation went through several name changes over the summer but was eventually renamed Generation shortly before the fall semester began.

Under the new editor in chief, the publication took on some drastic changes, including: making it into a biweekly publication, colorizing every page and making them glossy and removing the popular "I'm Right, You're Wrong" section and personals.

Sub-Board I, Inc. voted to suspend Generation for the rest of the fall semester on the day the first issue was released.

== Post-hiatus ==
Generation did return from hiatus and was published between January 2010 and April 2014. However, the magazine no longer appears to be active. After the University terminated its relationship with Sub Board I, Inc. in 2019, an alumni group founded online magazine Subject as a spiritual successor to Generation (as well as WRUB radio, which was shut down along with Sub Board).
