= Love Missile F1-11 =

Single by Sigue Sigue Sputnik

from the album Flaunt It
- B-side: "Hack Attack"
- Released: 17 February 1986
- Genre: Synth-pop
- Length: 3:45
- Label: Parlophone
- Songwriters: Anthony James; Martin Degville; Neal Whitmore
- Producer: Giorgio Moroder

Sigue Sigue Sputnik singles chronology
"Love Missile F1-11" (1986)	"21st Century Boy" (1986)

"Love Missile F1-11" is the debut single by the British new wave band Sigue Sigue Sputnik, released in 1986 from their debut studio album Flaunt It. It was the band's biggest hit, reaching number three on the UK singles chart. The track was produced by Giorgio Moroder, after Prince rejected a request to oversee production, complaining the track was "too violent." The band approached Moroder due to his work on a number of Hollywood film scores, as well as his early Donna Summer records, with the latter inspiring the band's trademark repetitive, synthetic bass sound.

In 1987 Pop Will Eat Itself released a cover of the song. In the 2000s David Bowie released a cover of the song.

== Style ==
The song features vocals with high echo and uses multiple sound effects to create a futuristic atmosphere. The 'Ultraviolence Mix' begins with a sample from Stanley Kubrick's 1971 film A Clockwork Orange where Malcolm McDowell's character, Alex, professes his fondness for a bit "of the old ultra-violence". None of the movie samples included in the originally released version of the single were cleared, resulting in film director Kubrick taking action against the band, who were forced to pay him a substantial fee. All samples were removed for the US release of the track, with some replaced by re-recordings using voice mimics, a move founding band member Tony James blames for "killing the record" in America.

== Track listing ==
7": Parlophone / SSS 1 (UK)

1. "Love Missile F1-11" – 3:45
2. "Hack Attack" – 3:50

12": Parlophone / 12 SSS 1 (UK)

1. "Love Missile F1-11" (Extended Version) – 6:55
2. "Love Missile F1-11" (Dance Mix) – 4:27
3. "Hack Attack" – 3:50

12": Parlophone / 12 SSS 1 (UK)

1. "Love Missile F1-11" (The Bangkok Remix) – 6:28
2. "Love Missile F1-11" (Dance Mix) – 4:27
3. "Hack Attack" – 3:50

12": Manhattan / V-56021 (US)

1. "Love Missile F1-11" (Extended Version) – 6:52
2. "Love Missile F1-11" (Dance Mix) – 4:31
3. "Love Missile F1-11" (Single Version) – 3:45

Special Edition 12": Parlophone / 12 SSSX 1 (UK)

1. "Trailer Mix" – 1:16
2. "Love Missile F1-11" (Video Mix) – 3:45
3. "Love Missile F1-11 & 'Actuality' Sound" – 3:46
4. "Hard Attack" (Dub) – 3:52

Cassette: Manhattan / 4V 56021 (US)

1. "Love Missile F1-11" (Extended Version)
2. "Love Missile F1-11" (Dance Version)
3. "Love Missile F1-11" (Single Version)
4. "Love Missile F1-11" (Bangkok Remix)

== Charts ==
=== Weekly charts ===
Chart (1986)	Peak position
Australia (Kent Music Report)	32
Austria (Ö3 Austria Top 40)	9
Belgium (Ultratop 50 Flanders)	20
Europe (European Hot 100 Singles)	13
Finland (Suomen virallinen lista)	3
Ireland (IRMA)	3
Italy (Musica e dischi)	24
Netherlands (Dutch Top 40)	36
Netherlands (Single Top 100)	30
New Zealand (Recorded Music NZ)	21
South Africa (Springbok Radio)	2
Spain (AFYVE)	1
Switzerland (Schweizer Hitparade)	6
UK Singles (Official Charts)	3
US 12-inch Singles Sales (Billboard)	47
US Dance/Disco Club Play (Billboard)	50
West Germany (GfK)	3

=== Year-end charts ===
Chart (1986)	Position
Europe (European Hot 100 Singles)	60
Spain (AFYVE)	7
UK Singles (OCC)	67
West Germany (Media Control)	46

== Certifications ==
Region	Certification	Certified units/sales
United Kingdom (BPI)	Silver	250,000^{^}
^{^} Shipments figures based on certification alone.

== In other media ==
Love Missile F1-11 features on the soundtrack to Ferris Bueller's Day Off, playing in an early scene following the opening credits sequence, as his plan to manifest his day off has begun to take shape.
