= Sigue Sigue Sputnik =

British new wave / synth-pop band

- Sigue Sigue Sputnik, 1986.

Background information
- Also known as: Sci-Fi Sex Stars
- Origin: London, England
- Genres: New wave; synth-pop; hi-NRG; post-punk; glam punk; electronic
- Works: Sigue Sigue Sputnik discography
- Years active: 1982–1990; 1995; 1998–2004
- Labels: Parlophone; EMI; Cleopatra; Sputnikworld Ltd
- Past members: Tony James; Neal X; Martin Degville; Chris Kavanagh; Ray Mayhew; Yana YaYa; John Green; Christopher Novak; Claudia Cujo

Sigue Sigue Sputnik were a British new wave band formed in London in 1982 by former Generation X bassist Tony James. The band had three UK top-40 hit singles: "Love Missile F1-11", "21st Century Boy", and "Success".

The band's music, image and inspiration drew from a range of electronic and glam bands such as Suicide and the New York Dolls.

== History ==
=== Early years ===
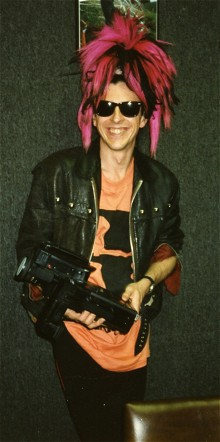
Tony James in San Francisco, 1986

The band, which is often just called "Sputnik", were formed by Tony James, ex-bassist of the defunct Generation X, and Neal X (Whitmore), who recruited singer Martin Degville. Degville was a clothes designer and supplied the band's wardrobe, and YaYa, the store where he worked, became the band's base. Their first gig was in Paris, supporting Johnny Thunders, with James' former Generation X colleague and then drummer for Thunders, Mark Laff, on drums.

Mick Jones, formerly of the Clash, worked with the band as live sound engineer, helped manipulate their sound, and appeared with them when they opened for New Model Army. Fachtna O'Kelly, manager of the Boomtown Rats who had provided much of the band's equipment, provided the band with the name Sigue Sigue Sputnik, as a supposed reference to a Russian street gang and meaning, in rough translation "burn, burn satellite" ("sigue" coming from a form of the Russian verb сжигать, meaning burn, and Sputnik referencing the first man-made satellite launched by the Soviet Union in 1957), however a Filipino gang of the same name has existed since at least the 1960s.The band's sound was, according to James, arrived at by accident, when he inadvertently mixed elements of film soundtracks with their demo track "Love Missile F1-11" while putting together a video compilation from his favourite films.

The definitive, classic line up (In addition to James, X and Degville), was completed by the addition of not one, but two drummers: Chris Kavanagh and Ray Mayhew (both chosen by James for their looks, attitude and onstage sound and aesthetics). Sixth member, Degville's longtime friend and business partner, Miss Yana YaYa (Real name: Jane Farrimond), provided the samples of the band's signature audio clips — such as snippets from classic sci-fi films, TV commercials, pop-culture soundbites, and negative media reviews. A Tascam Portastudio 4-Track Cassette Recorder was used for this purpose, where Yana would manually fire, play, and mute the individual tracks using the Portastudio's mixer faders to inject the "samples" live into the music. The dub/echo effects used the Roland RE-201 Space Echo unit and the closely related Roland RE-301 Chorus Echo unit in their live settings. Lead singer Martin Degville's vocal microphone signal was split in two. One clean signal went straight to the main front-of-house soundboard, while the other side was routed directly to Yana's station on stage. She would manually twist the intensity and repeat knobs live, sending dub-style vocal feedback, pitch-bends, and runaway tape delay over the mix at will.

=== Commercial success (1984–1989) ===
Interest in the band increased sharply in 1984 after James was interviewed by the NME, with several record companies sending representatives to their next performance at the Electric Cinema in London, and they were invited to perform on The Tube. The band were signed by EMI, with the band themselves claiming in the press that they had signed for £4 million, though in fact revealed to be £350,000 (a record signing of an unknown band at that time). James wanted the band to be produced by David Bowie or Prince, with the latter rejecting the offer because the band's material was "too violent." Also shortlisted were John Carpenter and Giorgio Moroder because of their soundtrack work. Ultimately, Giorgio Moroder was chosen. The band's first single, the Moroder-produced "Love Missile F1-11", was released in February 1986, and reached number 3 in the UK Singles Chart, number 2 in South Africa and was a major hit in several countries in Europe and Asia. Its popularity was boosted by its inclusion in the John Hughes film Ferris Bueller's Day Off. The samples used in the single had not received copyright clearance, and were replaced in the US version, a move that James says "killed the record" in America.

Their second single, "21st Century Boy" reached number 20 in the UK, a relative disappointment James blamed on audiences tiring of the band due to overexposure in the media. Despite largely negative reviews, their debut studio album, Flaunt It, also produced by Moroder, made the top ten in the UK, and reached 96 in the US. The album included paid commercials between tracks, James stated prior to its release that they would sell 20–to-30-second advertising slots for between $2,500 and $7,000. He explained this by saying "commercialism is rampant in society. Maybe we're a little more honest than some groups I could mention," and "our records sounded like adverts anyway". Advertisements that did sell (including spots for i-D Magazine and Studio Line from L'Oréal) were complemented by ironic spoof ads including one for the Sputnik corporation itself claiming that "Pleasure is our Business". A subsequent tour was characterised by poor ticket sales and crowd violence, but James claimed the tour was also affected by an alleged vendetta by the UK tabloid Daily Mirror, which made the public think the band were bad live performers.

It was two years before the band followed this up, and subsequent releases fared less well. The Stock Aitken Waterman produced "Success" peaked at number 31 in late 1988, with James blaming the track's underperformance on its generic pop production and a poor quality video. The singles that followed peaked outside the top 40. Second album Dress for Excess peaked at number 53 in the UK but sold well in Brazil. The band split up in July 1989, with James joining The Sisters of Mercy later that year. Chris Kavanagh went on to Big Audio Dynamite II joining Mick Jones. Mayhew formed Mayhem Deranged.

A collection of early demo recordings from 1984 and 1985, along with three tracks from 1990, First Generation, was released in 1991.

=== Reunions ===
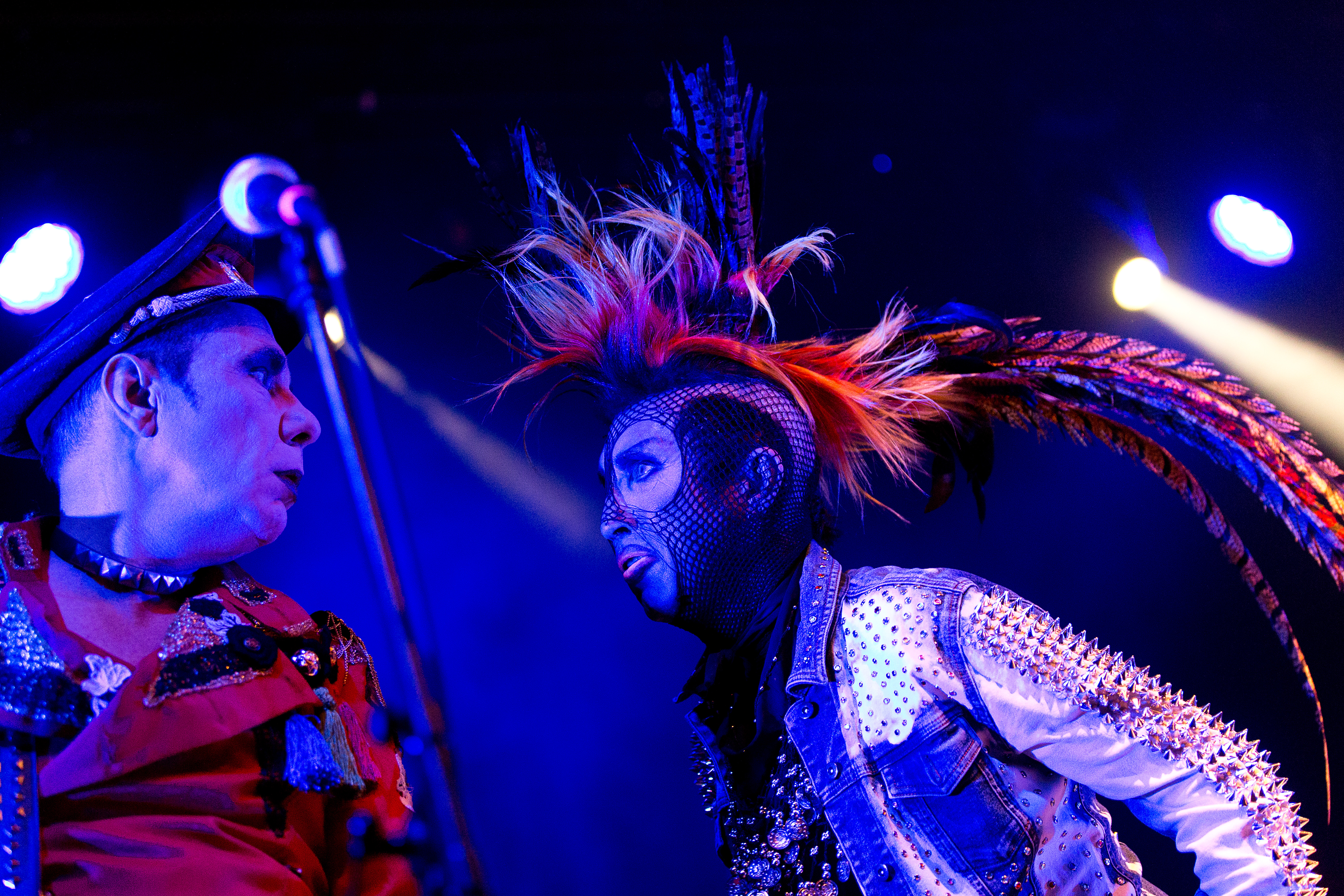
Sigue Sigue Sputnik Electronic in 2016 at the 25th Wave-Gotik-Treffen in Leipzig/Germany.

In 1995, James and X formed a new version of the band with Christopher Novak (vocals) and John Green (keyboards). Their song "Cyberspace Party" was a hit in Japan; an album, Sputnik: The Next Generation, was also released there, selling 50,000 copies. In 1998, with Degville back on vocals and with Claudia Cujo on drums, the band started to perform again, resulting in the 2000 release of Piratespace.

In 2004, Degville left the band to pursue a solo career and has performed as Sputnik 2/ Sputnik 2 – The Future and Sigue Sigue Sputnik Electronic, self-releasing tracks under those and his own name over the years through www.sputnik2.com and other digital sites. In 2016, a 12" vinyl version of a track called "Timex Kid" was released under the Sigue Sigue Sputnik Electronic name.

Neal X is a member of the Marc Almond band, and went on to form his own group, the Montecristos, which released its debut album "Born to Rock n' Roll" in 2015 following a successful crowd funding project.

Tony James formed the group Carbon/Silicon with Mick Jones which has released a number of free tracks digitally via www.carbonsilicon.com as well as selling music commercially, including the 2007 album release The Last Post. James appeared at the 2023 Glastonbury Festival as a member of Generation Sex, featuring James and Billy Idol from Generation X, and Steve Jones and Paul Cook from the Sex Pistols

Drummer Ray Mayhew died on 28 August 2025, aged 60.

== Image ==
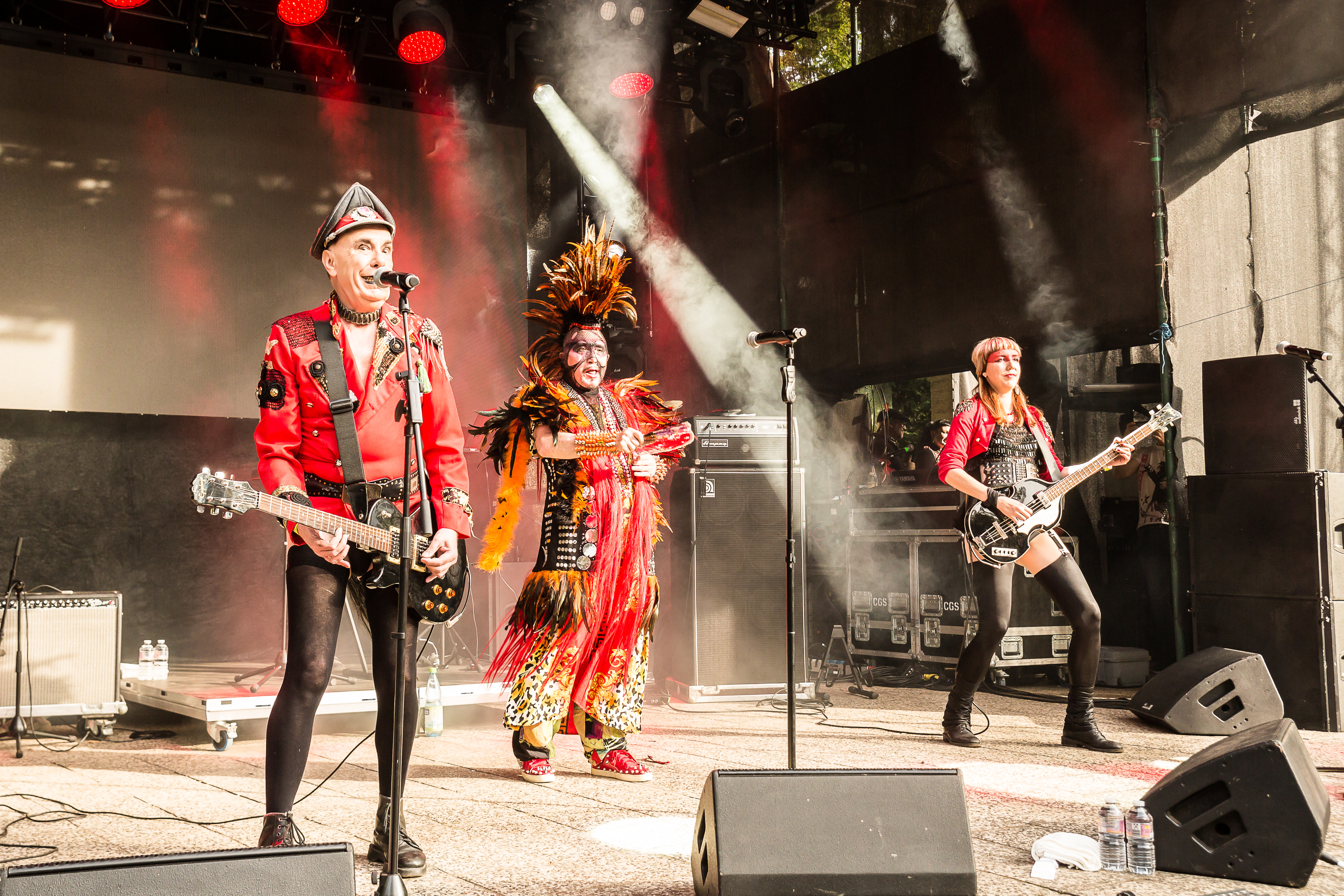
Sigue Sigue Sputnik Electronic in 2023

James claimed he had chosen his bandmates for their looks, and the band's slogan was "Fleece the World". James billed the band as "Hi-tech sex, designer violence, and the fifth generation of rock 'n' roll". He also often referred the band as 'The bastard sons of Ziggy', a humorous take on Bowie's aesthetic influence on the group.

The themes and imagery in the band's songs were often influenced by futuristic, dystopian or post-apocalyptic films such as A Clockwork Orange, The Terminator, Blade Runner and the Mad Max trilogy. Visually, their image included fishnet masks and brightly coloured hair.

== Members ==
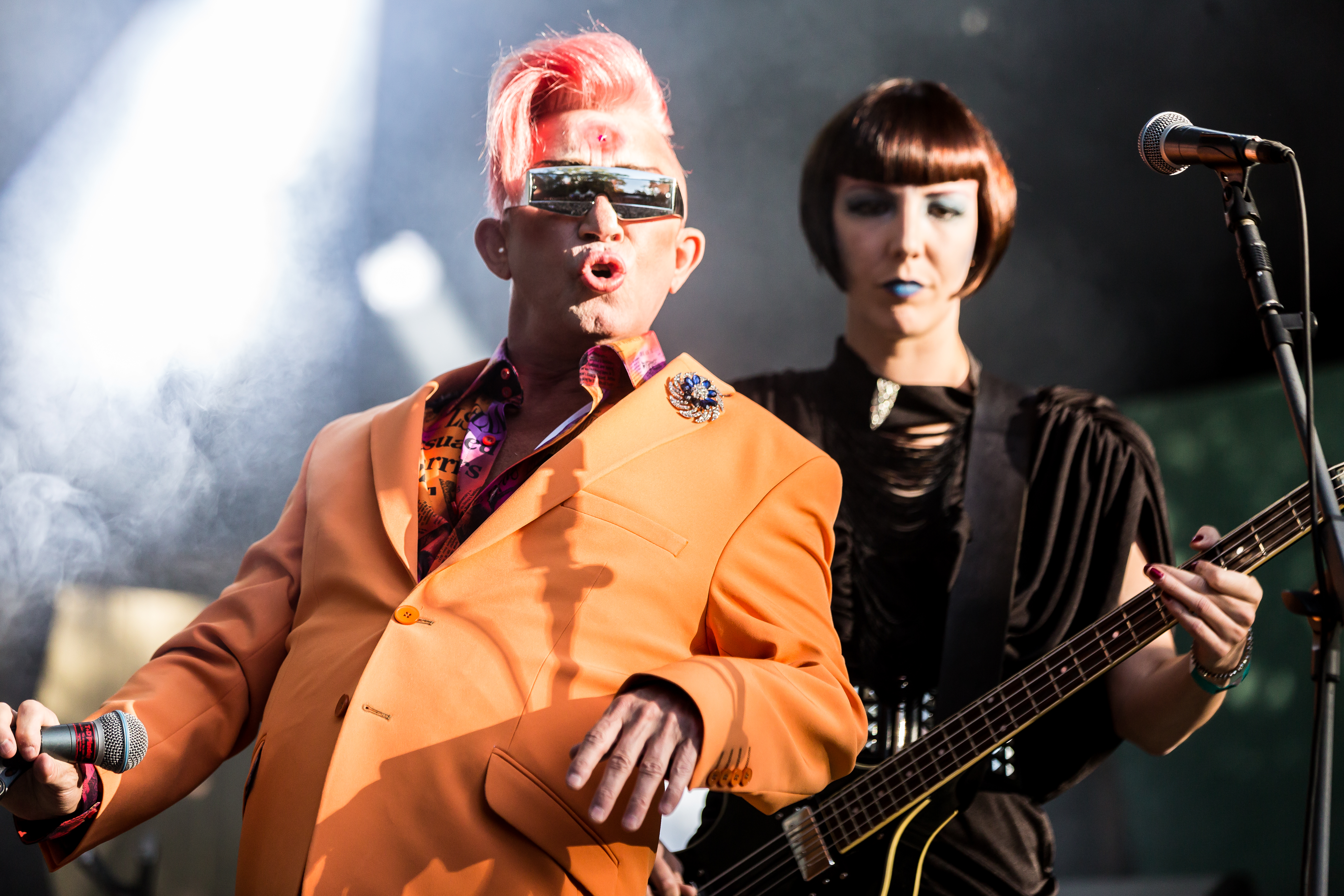
Sigue Sigue Sputnik Electronic in 2017

- Tony James – space guitar, electric guitar, synth guitar, bass guitar, keyboards, backing vocals (1982–1989, 1995, 1998–2004)
- Neal X – guitar, backing vocals (1982–1989, 1995, 1998–2004)
- Martin Degville – lead vocals (1982–1989, 1998–2004)
- Chris Kavanagh – drums, electronic drums (1982–1989)
- Ray Mayhew (died 28 August 2025) – drums, electronic drums (1982–1989)
- Yana YaYa (Jane Farrimond) – keyboards, dub effects, samples (1982–1989)
- John Green – keyboards (1995)
- Christopher Novak – lead vocals (1995)
- Claudia Cujo – drums (1998)
- Jenny Z – effects (2001–2004)

== Discography ==
- Flaunt It (1986)
- Dress for Excess (1988)
- Sputnik: The Next Generation (1996)
- Piratespace (2001)
- Blak Elvis vs. The Kings of Electronic Rock and Roll (2002)
- Ultra Real (2003)
