= Martin Degville =

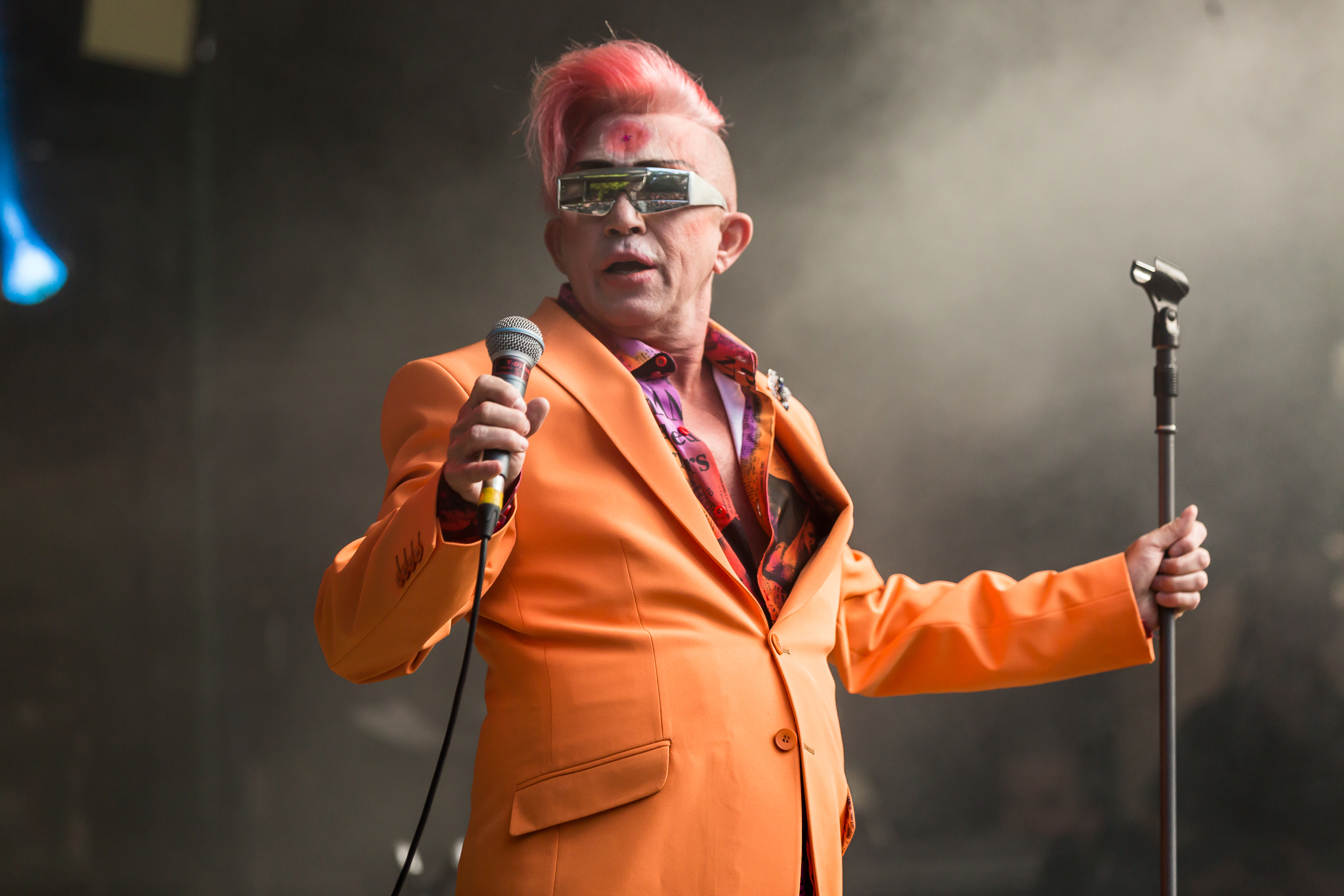
- Degville performing in 2017

Background information
- Born: Martin Degville; 27 January 1961 (age 65); Walsall, Staffordshire, England
- Genres: New wave; hi-NRG; post-punk; glam punk; electronic
- Occupations: Singer; songwriter
- Instrument: Vocals
- Formerly of: Sigue Sigue Sputnik; Sputnik 2 – The Future; Sci-Fi Superstars; Sigue Sigue Sputnik Electronic

Martin Degville (born 27 January 1961) was the lead vocalist and co-songwriter of the British new wave band Sigue Sigue Sputnik, which had a worldwide hit single in 1986 with "Love Missile F1-11" and six other EMI single releases. Sigue Sigue Sputnik was formed with ex-Generation X bassist Tony James.

== Biography ==
Degville hails from Walsall and was a familiar face on the Birmingham club scene of the late 1970s and early 1980s at clubs such as The Rum Runner and The Hostaria (Wine Bar). Before Sigue Sigue Sputnik (SSS) he had worked selling clothes, and he was spotted by Tony James and Neal X while dancing in his Yaya boutique. Degville's former flatmate is Boy George, and George worked in Degville's shop (Degville's Dispensary) during the time that he lived in Walsall. Degville was also a fashion designer who styled Sigue Sigue Sputnik's original image, and musical style.

=== Solo career ===
Following the initial split of SSS in 1990, Degville started working with guitarist Mick Rossi (from the band Slaughter & the Dogs) with a view to producing material as a solo artist.

A new single “I Surrender” was recorded, which Degville and Rossi debuted on the Sky TV show “Hit Studio International”. However, an official release did not materialise.

Before the year was out, Degville appeared on the late night TV Show “Timeshift” presented by Jono Coleman, performing another track, “Nuclear Powered Sex Machine”. During the interview with Coleman, Degville said that he had written enough material for two albums but first, the aforementioned track was to be included on a six-track EP/mini-album entitled World War 4 and was to be released in the New Year via Trojan Records. The expected EP did not see the light of day but in 1991, World War 4 was released as a 10-track vinyl/13-track CD solo album through Receiver Records (a subsidiary of Trojan).

An immediate follow-up album was in the pipeline and in 1992, Degville promoted the fact through his fan club with the intention of releasing the track “Techno Crash” as a limited edition 12” to fan club members. However, this release did not come to fruition although the song was reworked and included on the Jungle Records SSS album The First Generation – Second Edition in 1994.

Aside from some ad hoc SSS recordings in the mid-90s, Degville returned to performing with Tony James and Neal X in 1998 which led to three new SSS studio albums being released between 2000 and 2003. Degville then formally left SSS in the summer of 2003.

Degville has since recorded and performed material under the names Sputnik 2 - The Future, Sci-Fi-Superstars, and Sigue Sigue Sputnik Electronic but from time to time has released further recordings under his own name (including the 2018 release of "Spirit in the Sky").

=== Sputnik 2 – The Future ===
After Degville had decided to leave SSS, it was not long before he had set up his own website and set about performing and releasing music under the moniker of “Sputnik 2 – The Future” (although sometimes shortened to "Sputnik2"). In 2004, a new six-track EP entitled Smart1 was released. The EP featured 4 previously unreleased Degville tracks which included “World War 4”, “Psychodelik”, “Slag in the Back (Of My Cadilliac)” and “Don’t Dabble with the Devil”.

Sputnik 2 undertook some short sets to promote the Smart1 EP with a number of different backing musicians including the two-piece band Dead Heaven.

Subsequently, in 2005, Degville started to work with the Scottish production duo "DiSCOKiNGZ" (a.k.a. DV8), Paul Fitzgerald and Stephen Buxey. They introduced a new track to the set, “Planet Bi”. DiSCOKiNGZ went on to record, produce and remix versions of “Don’t Dabble with the Devil” and “Planet Bi”. DiSCOKiNGZ also toured with Degville as part of the Sputnik2 band.

=== Sci-Fi Superstars ===
During 2005, Degville appeared on the BBC TV show Never Mind the Buzzcocks and confirmed that he was working on his new project, “Sci-Fi Superstars”. In February 2006, the album It’s So Chic to be a Sci-Fi Freak was released.

In 2008, Degville started a collaboration with the Spanish brothers David and Santi Lluch, also known as The Hellbilly Club. However, it was not until 2009 that Degville announced that this collaboration was to now be formally taken forward under the band name of Sci-Fi Superstars with the 15-track Prophet of Freak album released in April.

=== Sigue Sigue Sputnik Electronic ===
Midway through 2009, Degville started to play live as Sigue Sigue Sputnik Electronic (SSSE) alongside Johann Weidemann (who took on the keyboards/FX).

In April 2011, a re-recorded mastered version of “Flaunt it” was released, produced by producer/remixer Lloyd Price. in June 2011, a limited 16-track mastered CD-R entitled Revisited was released which included a track called "Fascination" (originally a demo during the Sputnik 2 era) and a new, slower version of "Don't Dabble..." entitled "Unknown Soul" re-envisaged by Lloyd. A selection of re-recorded tracks from the Degville/SSS back catalogue made up the other tracks.

October 2012 saw the release of Electronic DNA, an album full of new songs produced by Lloyd Price who was responsible for the co-writing of numerous tracks on the album. Two video trailers were launched on YouTube over a three-week period prior to the release by Price, with the first showcasing a snippet of the track "Terror Bytes" and the second mixing a number of the songs. The album was formally released in both download and limited-edition mastered CD-R formats. Electronic DNA was the last full album release under the SSSE name.

SSSE released a 12" vinyl single entitled "Timex Kid" in 2015.

== Solo discography ==
=== Solo/Martin Degville ===
Albums

- 1991 World War Four (10-track vinyl and cassette/13-track CD released via Receiver Records)
- 2008 Guns, Oil, Drugs (11-track CDR self-release featuring unmastered tracks)
- 2008 Sputnik 2 – The Future (nine-track CDR and digital self-release featuring unmastered tracks)
- 2014 Demolition (12-track digital self-release featuring unmastered tracks)
- 2016 The Collective (12-track digital self-release featuring unmastered tracks)

Extended plays

- 2008 The Good, the Bad & the Fabulous (four-track CDR given away free with a DVD package)
- 2012 Unplugged (four-track digital-only release)
- 2018 Spirit in the Sky (10-track digital-only remix package released in 2018, followed by a nine-track "Part 2" remix package in 2019)

=== Sputnik 2 ===
Extended plays

- 2004 Smart1 (six-track studio-mastered self-release)

=== Sci-Fi Superstars ===
Albums

- 2006 It's So Chic to Be a Sci-Fi Freak (18-track CD-R self-release)
- 2009 Space Age Junkie (eight-track digital-only release including mastered tracks and demos not included on "Prophet of Freak" album)
- 2009 Prophet of Freak (CD-R and digital self-release; fully mastered 15-track album plus two bonus tracks given away digitally)

=== Sigue Sigue Sputnik Electronic ===
Albums

- 2011 Flaunt It (10-track CD-R and digital download)
- 2011 Revisited (16-track limited edition CD-R and 15-track digital download)
- 2012 Electronic DNA (10-track CD-R and digital download)
- 2013 Electronic DNA - The Remixes (16-track digital download)

Extended plays

- 2009 Sputnik vs Bowie (initially a six-track CD-R and digital download albeit in 2012, a further two tracks were included on the digital download via Reverbnation)
- 2010 Futuatronik (four-track CD-R and digital download)
- 2011 Fascination - The Remixes (Part 1) (eight-track digital-only release)
- 2011 Fascination - The Remixes (Part 2) (seven-track digital-only release)
- 2013 Cover to Covers (five-track digital-only release)
- 2013 Resurrection (four-track digital-only release)
- 2014 Love Missile F1-11 2014 - The Remixes (17-track digital-only release)
- 2015 Where Have All The Rock Stars Gone? - The Remixes (12-track digital-only release)
- 2015 Timex Kid (four-track 12" and six-track digital release)

== Other commercial releases ==
- 2007 "Planet Bi (Pilgrim Omega)": Martin Degville (track included on the various-artists compilation album, “Electraparade”)
- 2008 "I Fought the Law": Bettie Ford featuring Martin Degville (B-side to the "One for the Road" single)
- 2008 "21st Century Boy": The Hellbilly Club featuring Martin Degville (track on the "No More Parasites" album)
- 2015 She's Outta Fashion: Banshee featuring Martin Degville (two-track digital-only release)
