= Neal X =

- Born: Neal Whitmore; Henley-on-Thames, England
- Genres: New wave; pop punk
- Occupation: Musician
- Instrument: Guitar

Neal X (born Neal Whitmore) is the former guitarist with the British band Sigue Sigue Sputnik. They had a No. 3 UK hit single with "Love Missile F1-11" in 1986. He has also worked as a sideman for Adam Ant and Marc Almond. Whitmore founded the Montecristos who released their debut album Born to Rock 'N' Roll in 2015. He is a member of the band the Loveless, alongside Marc Almond, Iggy Pop's rhythm section Ben Ellis and Mat Hector, and James Beaumont.
