= 1998 Webby Awards =

US internet awards ceremony

The 1998 Webby Awards were held on March 6, 1998, at the San Francisco Palace of Fine Arts, and were the first event ever to be broadcast live via the Web in 3D. The "People's Voice" awards, chosen by online poll, received 100,000 cumulative votes that year.

The Web magazine, which was hosting the awards, was closed down by its parent company IDG shortly before the awards, and the ceremony continued thereafter under the management of Tiffany Shlain, who IDG had hired in 1996 to coordinate the awards. The International Academy of Digital Arts and Sciences was constituted that year as the judging panel for the awards, continues to do so as of the 2007 awards.

== Nominees and winners ==
Winners and nominees:

Category	Winner	Other nominees
Net Art	Entropy8	Ada's web Atlas; RGB Gallery sfgallery
Community	The WELL	bianca.com The Palace; Tripod; WBS
Education	StarChild	Educational Resources Information Center (ERIC); Learn2.com; The Home Education Page; The Smithsonian
Film	The Internet Movie Database	E! Online; Film.com; Mr. Showbiz; Rough Cut
Games	BeZerk	GAMECENTER.COM; GameSpot; Imagine Games; PlaySite
Health	Mayo Clinic Health O@sis	Ask Dr. Weil; Reuters Health Information Services; The Body: A Multimedia AIDS and HIV Resource thriveonline.com
Home	BabyCenter	Better Homes & Gardens Online; Disney's Daily Blast; Family.com; Virtual Garden
Living	Gurl.com	PlanetOut; SWOON; Virtual Jerusalem; Wedding Channel
Money/Business	The Vanguard Group	International Real Estate Digest; Nolo press Self-Help Law Center; The Financial Aid Information Page; U.S. Securities and Exchange Commission
Music	Experience Music Project	Addicted to Noise; MTV Online; TheDJ AOL Radio; Tunes.com
News	NEWS.COM	ABCNEWS.com; MSNBC; The New York Times on the Web; Wired News
Politics+Law	CNN/TIME All Politics	Annoy.com; Law Journal EXTRA! The Black World Today; The Smoking Gun
Print+Zines	Salon Magazine	alt.culture Literary Kicks; Merriam-Webster; The Libyrinth
Radio	AudioNet	Antique Radios Online; DigiBand Radio; The Art Bell Web Site; Uncle Ricky's Reel Top 40 Repository
Science	Exploratorium: ExploraNet	IBM Patent Server; Mars Pathfinder Mission; Paleontology Without Walls; Scientific American
Sports	CBS Sportsline	CHARGED; ESPN SportsZone; Outside Online; Science of Hockey
Travel	Citysearch New York City	Lonely Planet on-line Preview Travel; Salon|Wanderlust; Travelocity
TV	PBS Online	GIST TV Listings Guide; NBC.com; Sci-Fi Channel: The Dominion; TV Guide Entertainment Network
Weird	Bert is Evil	BLAIR; Museum of Dirt; The Crash Site; The Onion
