= Sissyfight 2000 =

2000 video game

- Developer: Word Magazine
- Publisher: Word Magazine
- Platform: Macromedia Shockwave
- Release: 2000
- Genre: Turn-based strategy
- Mode: Multiplayer

Sissyfight 2000 (stylised as SiSSYFiGHT 2000) is a turn-based strategy online game developed by the Word online magazine staff, including executive producer Marisa Bowe, producer Naomi Clark, lead programmer Ranjit Bhatnagar, and art director Yoshi Sodeoka, with game designer Eric Zimmerman. The original Shockwave version launched in 2000 but went offline in early 2009. A successful crowdfunding campaign was launched in early 2013 on Kickstarter by some members of the original development team, who announced the re-release of the game as open-source in HTML5. The original date for the game's relaunch was September 2013, but was delayed. An open beta test, started on 30 July 2014, is currently underway.

The gameplay is simple on its surface but requires solid strategy to win consistently. The graphics are also simple, and were inspired by the work of "outsider artist" Henry Darger, illustrator Edward Gorey, Japanese anime, and early, 8-bit video games of the 1980s. The game, which was inspired in part by Lucasfilm's pioneering online role-playing game, Habitat, was designed to ignite community-building through chat both in the game and on its associate message boards.

In a departure from the androcentric norm in video games, all of the players in Sissyfight were rendered female and nonsexual. Sissyfight is often cited as an early example of a web-based MMOG in gaming development and academic circles. Although each game session only contained three to six players at a time, the mechanics of "brownie points" and the robust community surrounding Sissyfight created a much more "massive" experience than most small-scale web games.

== Gameplay ==
Three to six players – called "sissies" – can play in a single game with each player beginning a round with ten hearts, each heart representing one "self-esteem point". The turn-based game hides a player's moves from the other players while in-game chat bubbles may be used to create alliances and coordinate their moves collectively. With each round, players try to eliminate each other's self-esteem until only two (or occasionally one or none) are left standing and proclaimed the winners of that game on a classroom-style blackboard.

The moves that a player can select in each round are:

- Scratch: An attack which deals a -1 penalty to the defender. Can be countered with either a cower or a grab, and does double damage if the victim is being grabbed or licking a lolly.
- Grab: A passive attack which prevents the defender from scratching, teasing, or licking. It also sometimes prevents other players from grabbing. A grab also acts as a 2x multiplier against a defender when she is also being scratched.
- Tease: An attack entirely dependent on teamwork. A single-person tease (also called a "solo tease") is ineffective against a defender. However, for every cumulative teaser added, the defender receives 2 damage. For example, two teasers do 4 damage, three do 6 damage, four do 8 damage, and five can wipe out a player in the first round with 10 damage. A single grab will nullify a two-person tease.
- Cower: A defensive move which can dodge a single scratch, grab, or tattle. Multiple cowers tried when there is no attack will receive a -1 penalty.
- Lick Your Lolly: A high-risk defensive move which normally adds 2 hit points. Since the maximum number of self-esteem points in the game is 10, licking with either 9 or 10 points wastes a lolly. If an attacker scratches someone licking, the licker will choke and receive a -2 penalty instead. A lick can also be stopped (with no penalty) if the licker is grabbed. Teases do not interfere with licks, but if a licker receives enough damage to be defeated with a tease, the player will be defeated, regardless of whether or not the lick would have allowed the licker to survive the tease. Each player can lick a total of three times in a single game.
- Tattle on Everyone: An attack which can potentially damage everyone else in the game. The tattle does 3 damage to anyone scratching, grabbing, teasing, or being grabbed or scratched. If two or more players tattle at the same time, the tattle backfires and does 3 damage to each tattler. A successful tattle can be dodged by a cower or a successful lick. Each player can tattle only twice in a single game.

Failure to select a move before the timer reaches zero results in -1 self-esteem point as a penalty, thereby gradually eliminating those who do not decide in time. However, many players tease out consistently indecisive players. Additionally, if all the players make their decisions with more than 10 seconds left on the timer, the timer accelerates to a countdown from 10, ending the round early.

=== Cheating ===
Players found several ways to cheat in the game. Most often, two players resort to using a third-party instant messaging service in order to coordinate their moves outside of the in-game chat interface. Other players developed more sophisticated methods, including running multiple sessions of the game and creating secondary or unregistered accounts ("sock puppets" or "socks") to tilt a game's outcome in their favor.

The Honor Code, Sissyfight's terms of service, strictly forbids these behaviors. With the 2014 revival of the game, multisessioning has become more difficult; guest accounts are no longer allowed, and the game can now detect multiple sessions within the same browser.

=== Game variations ===
Players invented their own game variations, with unique rules. For example, "Tease Tag" required everyone to tease, while "Tease The Slow" required everyone to tease the last person to make a move. Other variations included a "no cower" rule, which was faster-paced and concentrated more on offense. Since these variants were not hard-coded into the original game, some players did not follow the special rules. As a result, the other players themselves often enforced the rules themselves by teasing out the rulebreakers.

The $25,000 "stretch goal" set by the development team for the 2013 Kickstarter campaign would have hard-coded some of these custom variations into the game. The funding ultimately fell short of meeting the stretch goal. However, in November 2013, the developers announced they would include custom game variations to compensate for missing their September 2013 deadline. The open beta test, running since 30 July 2014, includes settings for these custom game variations.

The 2014 revival features these hard-coded variations which are specifically created through the "special" option. Players may create their own game with a definitive title and identifier, which will have certain rules and challenges the normal game mode doesn't use. Some modes will disable certain defensive moves like lolly licking and cowering, others will prevent tattling to slightly increase difficulty, and others will make the timer speed up. These can be combined to make rounds even more challenging.

== History ==
Sissyfight was a surprise hit when it was launched in 2000. In 2001, it was a nominee for the Webby Awards in the Games category.

However, Sissyfight suffered from a lack of promotion and development after Zapata Corporation, its parent company, closed down Word late 2000. Nonetheless, the community proved strong enough to sustain itself, with unpaid administrator RamonaQ and a handful of volunteer moderators managing the game and message boards. Gamelab, a game development company founded by Zimmerman with other members of the original Sissyfight team on staff including programmer Ranjit Bhatnagar and designer Naomi Clark, maintained and ran the Sissyfight servers through April 2009.

Since its release, Sissyfight was consistently named a top internet game by online magazines and continued to remain popular among its regular players, even after the site became unavailable late April 2009.

=== Demise ===
On April 24, 2009, Sissyfight became unavailable. On April 28, 2009, long-time volunteer administrator RamonaQ announced on an unofficial message board that the site would not be returning anytime soon, as it was no longer being hosted.

=== Return of Sissyfight ===
Sissyfight 2000 Returns
- Developers: Zimmerman, Clark, and Bhatnagar
- Release: 2014
- Written in: node.js, SockJS, and CreateJS HTML5 library.
- Platform: Browser
- Type: Multiplayer Turn-based strategy
- License: MIT license, CC BY
- Website: http://www.sissyfight.com
- Repository: https://github.com/moonmilk/sissyfight/

On April 30, 2013, Zimmerman, Clark, and Bhatnagar announced a crowdfunding campaign on Kickstarter to revive Sissyfight. Their plans include re-coding the game in HTML5 to work in modern web browsers and mobile devices, releasing the code as open-source, adding new art, and provisioning servers utilizing modern technologies.

On May 28, 2013, the Sissyfight Kickstarter reached its $20,000 goal. The campaign was funded on May 30, 2013, with a final total of $22,735.

The game developers announced that they would not be providing any official message boards, choosing to leave that in the hands of the community. On August 8, 2013, a group of volunteers launched The SiSSYFiGHT 2000 Message Boards with the aim to reunite the community.

Two closed beta tests for the Kickstarter backers and their friends were held on January 17, 2014, and January 26, 2014. Each session lasted approximately two hours.

An open beta test began on July 30, 2014, and is currently running.

On February 9, 2018, the source code was released under the open-source MIT license and the assets under the CC BY Creative Commons license on GitHub.

== Credits ==
=== Original Team ===
- Executive Producer - Marisa Bowe
- Concept - The Staff of Word & Eric Zimmerman
- Game Design & Project Management - Eric Zimmerman
- Lead Programmer - Ranjit Bhatnagar
- Art Direction - Yoshi Sodeoka
- Art & Interface Design - Jason Mohr
- Producer & Assistant Game Designer - Naomi Clark
- Additional Programming - Wade Tinney
- Text - Naomi Clark and Daron Murphy
- Sound and Music - Lem Jay Ignacio
- Communication Engine - Lucas Gonze
- Additional Project Management - Michelle Golden

=== Sissyfight Returns ===
- Core Team - Ranjit Bhatnagar, Naomi Clark, Eric Zimmerman
- Visual Design - Cindi Geeze & Terry Wiley
- Interns - Aaron Freeman, Shoshana Kessock, Toni Pizza
