= Fred the Webmate =

1998 chatbot

Fred the Webmate

Fred the Webmate was a chatterbot created in 1998 for the defunct e-zine Word Magazine. It was inspired by an early computer program ELIZA, which attempted to mimic human conversation by use of a script.

The chatterbot was accessible on www.c404.tv/word/fred/index.html.

Visitors to the chatterbot encountered a simple graphic interface: an animated character living in a small, very clean apartment. This was Fred. Visitors could “talk” to Fred by typing questions. Fred would then “answer” via a program that recognized keywords in the questions and drew responses from a large inventory of pre-scripted replies.

To enhance the sense that visitors were talking to a real person, Fred's replies were idiosyncratic, informed by a semi-realistic backstory created for the character. Fred claimed to have been recently fired by a media company and was struggling to adjust to his new circumstances. Suffering from depression and insomnia, he was often pacing, smoking or drinking, and would occasionally pass out drunk. He gave “answers” that were frequently off-topic due to his variable mood and could be angry, jealous, rude, sad or euphoric during a conversation. He also had a number of sexual issues that he would routinely allude to but refuse to discuss in detail.

Fred's “personality” was designed to be both entertaining and a believable conversationalist. The chatbot became one of the most popular features of Word and received a large volume of personal email. The staff of Word responded to much of these emails in the “voice” of Fred, furthering the illusion that Fred was a real person.

In 1999, a second installment of Fred's life appeared on Word. It employed the same scripting technology as the first version, but Fred's story was updated and his range of “answers” was expanded. In this "episode" (for lack of a better term), Fred was no longer in his apartment. Instead, he was working in an office, performing data entry and other clerical tasks. Claiming that the job was “temporary,” he spent much of his time away from his desk — in the bathroom or office kitchen, pacing and drinking soda, assuring anyone who chatted with him that he would have a new and better job soon. Though he claimed to be happy, his script suggested otherwise, and continued to simulate “mood swings.”

When Word Magazine was shut down in 2000, Fred the Webmate, along with the rest of the site, was preserved in the San Francisco Museum of Modern Art.

Fred the Webmate was conceived, designed and programmed by Word's creative director ,Yoshi Sodeoka. He used Lingo and the app would run on Shockwave. with assistance from designer Jason Mohr. Its graphic interface was inspired by the aesthetics of the Commodore 64 computer. The chatterbot's script was written by Marisa Bowe, Naomi Clark, Daron Murphy, and Sabin Streeter. Fred's backstory was drawn from the real-life experiences of his creators and their friends and acquaintances during the late 1990s Dot-com bubble.
