= Word Magazine =

Influential online magazine, active from 1995–2000

- Website type: Online magazine
- Available in: English
- Founded: 1995
- Headquarters: New York City
- Owners: Icon CMT (1995–1998); Zapata Corporation (1998–2000)
- Founders: Carey Earle, Tom Livaccari, Dan Pelson
- Editor: Marisa Bowe
- Key people: Jonathan Van Meter, Jaime Levy, Daron Murphy
- Website: word.com
- Advertising: Yes
- Commercial: Yes
- Launched: 1995; 31 years ago
- Current status: Closed (as of August 2000)

Word Magazine was an online magazine active from 1995 to 2000.

== History ==
Launched in 1995 by Carey Earle, Tom Livaccari and Dan Pelson, Word Magazine created original stories, interviews, games, applications, music, interactive objects and art, and community spaces. Word published new content daily, and each story was treated as a unique interface design experiment. Word was also a pioneer in the use of online advertising and was the first website to integrate microsites into brand advertising online. It was also one of the first truly web-oriented online magazines.

Word's editorial team was originally led by Vibe magazine founding editor Jonathan Van Meter and creative director Jaime Levy. Marisa Bowe took over as editor-in-chief prior to the site's June 1995 launch and Yoshi Sodeoka became creative director in early 1996. Daron Murphy was a founding senior editor.

From 1998, Word featured a chatterbot named Fred the Webmate.

Word published comics every Tuesday ("Toozeday Komix") by the likes of such alternative cartoonists as Ben Katchor, Tony Millionaire, Kaz, Michael Kupperman, Dame Darcy, Mike Diana, Sam Henderson, Lauren Weinstein, Joe Sacco, and Harvey Pekar.

In 2000, Streeter, Bowe, Murphy, Rose Kernochan, and John Bowe co-edited a book of interviews, Gig: Americans Talk About Their Jobs, inspired by Studs Terkel's Working: People Talk About What They Do All Day and How They Feel About What They Do.

Also in 2000, Word staff developed the turn-based online strategy game Sissyfight 2000.

Word won awards from I.D. Magazine and Print Magazine, among others, and was placed in the permanent collection of the San Francisco Museum of Modern Art, the Walker Art Center and the Museum of the Moving Image.

Word was originally owned by Icon CMT until its sale in April 1998 to Zapata Corporation. Zapata closed Word.com in August, 2000.
