= Don't talk to me or my son ever again =

Internet meme

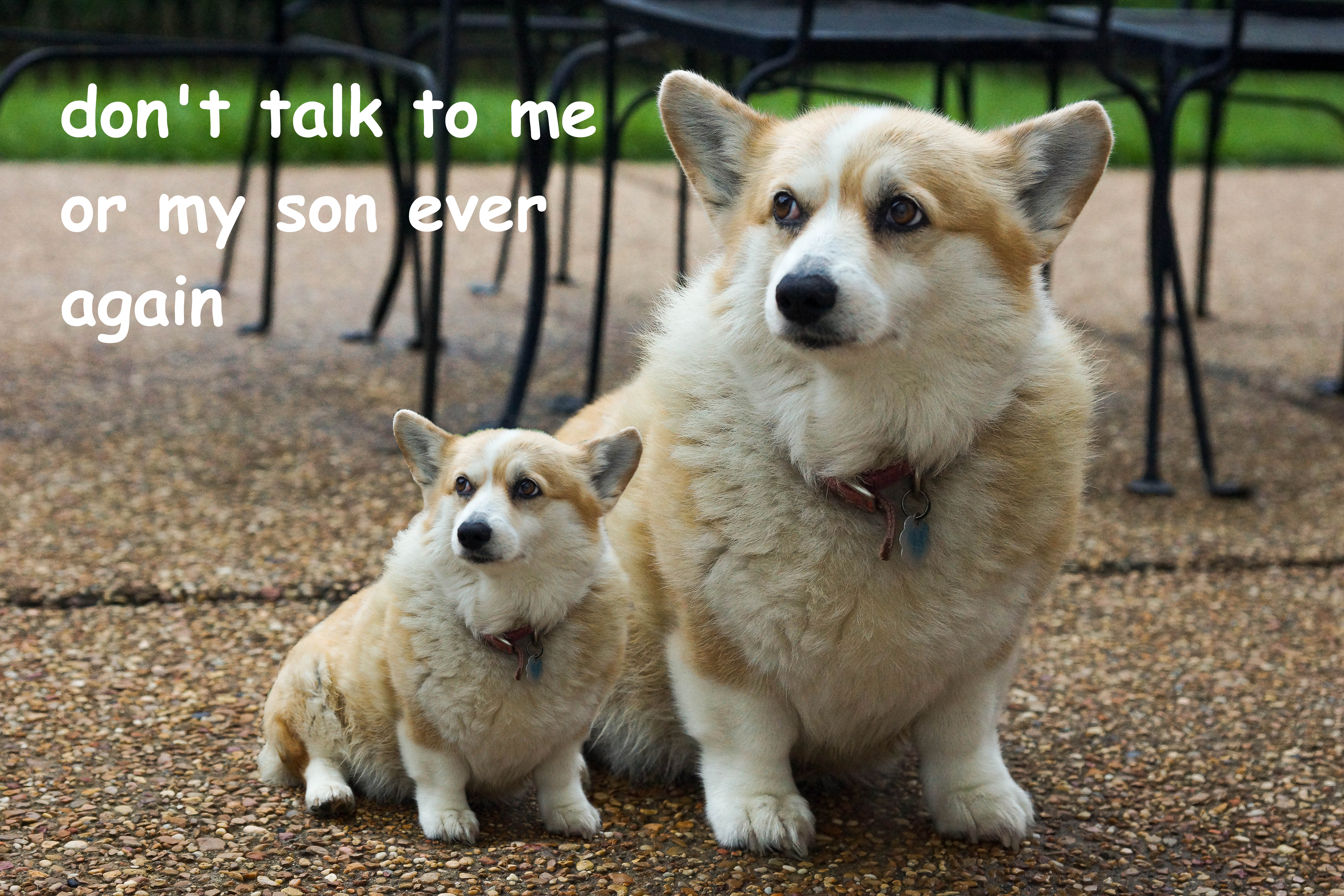
An example of a "Don't talk to me or my son ever again" meme; an image of a corgi, digitally altered to include a smaller duplicate with superimposed text.

"Don't talk to me or my son ever again" is an internet meme that reached a high level of virality in 2016. Posts of the meme typically show a picture of a subject, whether it be a product or a person, with a miniature of that subject as the "son" and the use of the phrase "Don't talk to me or my son ever again". The Verge identified it as the "meme of the summer" of 2016.

== History ==
The first use of the phrase "Don't talk to me or my son ever again" online was in a 2014 Tumblr post by user splendidland. The post showed red-colored text displaying the phrase over a screenshot of Spike Spiegel in the anime Cowboy Bebop next to a smaller-sized duplicate of the character. The "son" referred to the miniature of Spiegel. The post garnered approximately 6,300 notes by March 2016. The second Internet use of the meme was "don't you EVER talk to me or my son that way again", in an August 2015 Tumblr post by konkeydongcountry, which depicted a picture of two Yoshi dolls of different sizes and the phrase. In October 2015, a Twitter user under the name yoshibot used the phrase "don't you ever talk to me or my son again" in a picture he posted showing two Yoshi costumes, one much bigger than the other one. This time, the word "you" was added and the word "ever" was moved.

Vocativ suggested a Twitter post by ghostmajesty on November 30, 2015 using the phrase is what began the launch of the meme's publicity. The Daily Dot wrote that the meme "exploded in popularity" around February to March 2016 on services like Tumblr, Twitter and Facebook, and publications like Paper also covered the meme around this time. As of March 2016, the phrase has been used in 47,727 Twitter posts, according to Vocativ. PopSugar wrote that "A mixture of bad photoshopping and then actual photos have made this meme one that you can look at over and over again." Websites such as Smosh and Gurl.com did compilations of their favorite posts of the meme. In August 2016, The Verge's Kaitlyn Tiffany identified "Don't talk to me or my son ever again" to be the "meme of the summer." In a year-end list, Slate magazine labeled the meme "a stand-in for everything wrong with 2016 in the first half of this year."

== Concept ==
Most of the posts of the "Don't talk to me or my son ever again" meme use a miniature of a bigger person in the picture as the "son". However, there are also other forms of the meme that use actual smaller-sized versions of a product for the son, rather than using a smaller-sized visual of that product made through image editing. There are also versions of the meme that don't use a smaller copy of a large subject but make fun of the subject, an example being a post where Justin Bieber is the "son" of Ellen DeGeneres. Another example of the meme is a post on Twitter of Danny DeVito and Bernie Sanders, pointing out their similarities in demeanor but discrepancies in height. A journalist for New York magazine opined that the weirdest posts of the meme were from Tumblr.
