= Kibu.com =

American website for teenagers

- Website type: Online community
- Available in: English
- Founded: April 1999; 27 years ago
- Dissolved: October 2, 2000; 26 years ago
- Headquarters: Redwood City, United States
- Country of origin: United States
- Area served: Worldwide
- Editor: Lori Gottlieb
- CEO: Judy Macdonald
- Employees: 65
- Commercial: Yes
- Registration: Optional (required for message board)
- Launched: August 17, 2000; 26 years ago (Note: Kibu.com went online on May 1, 2000, but celebrated its official launch on August 17, 2000.)
- Current status: Defunct
- Native client on: Web browser

Kibu.com was an American website for teenage girls that was created in 1999 and launched in 2000. The website was founded as an online community for girls to discuss and exchange advice.

Kibu.com secured a US$22 million investment from high-profile figures in the tech industry, including Jim Clark. However, following the dot-com bubble burst, Kibu.com shut down on October 2, 2000, in only 46 days after launch. The company's leaders disclosed that the decision to shut down Kibu.com was made because of concerns in securing revenue in the future.

== History ==
Kibu.com was created in April 1999 as an online community for teenage girls. The name "Kibu" was derived from the Japanese word for "foundation" (基部). Judy Macdonald, the founder of the art CD-ROM PrintPak, was brought into staff as its CEO in September 1999. Molly Lynch, a former employee of @Home Network was also added as a staff member. In February 2000, Kibu.com received an investment of US$22 million from high-profile figures in Silicon Valley, such as Netscape co-founder Jim Clark, former @Home Network chairman Tom Jermoluk, the venture capital firm Kleiner Perkins Caufield & Byers, and CNET chairman Shelby Bonnie. Unlike other websites struggling from the dot-com bubble burst, the investors believed Kibu.com had the advantage in its demographic, as there had been a growth in teenage users online. Kibu.com predicted the investment would sustain the website up to Q2 2001 and hoped to make a profit by late 2001, with plans to have their own branded retail products and its own center in Ghirardelli Square located in San Francisco, California. In addition, ChickClick founder Heidi Swanson and her sister, Heather, were hired to work on the website.

Kibu.com went online on May 1, 2000. The website ran on revenue from sponsorship deals with Skechers, Barnes & Noble, and The Princeton Review, as well as attracting advertisements from Kmart. Unlike other websites, which used banner ads, Kibu.com offered product samples from its sponsors every month to 10,000 girls who completed their surveys. Kibu.com was also advertised by schoolgirls patronizing school clubs, gyms, and malls with the product samples, one example being lip gloss.

Kibu.com officially celebrated its launch on August 17, 2000, with a dot-com party. On October 2, 2000, Kibu.com shut down, laying off all of its 65 staff members. The website had only been open for 46 days at the time of closure. Jim Clark cited the dot-com bubble burst as its reason, stating that the timing of the website launch had occurred when financial markets were doing poorly. Vice president of marketing Katherine Phillips clarified that Kibu.com did not run out of funds, but she stated that the leaders of the company felt that Kibu.com would have trouble raising money in the near future. Furthermore, the market at the time lacked interest in websites with advertising-based business models. The money from the investors was returned. Afterwards, the staff members launched Kibupeople.com to post their resumes.

=== Aftermath ===
Following Kibu.com's closure, former editor-in-chief Lori Gottlieb co-authored the book Inside the Cult of Kibu: And Other Tales of the Millennial Gold Rush, with Jesse Jacobs, the former head of iFilm.com. In the book, Gottlieb discussed her experiences with working on Kibu.com.

== Content ==
Kibu.com had offered an online chat room and tips on fashion, beauty, and romance. The staff worked with 20 different channels to produce content for its topics. The sections were represented by "faces", a term referring to mentors consisting of women around 20 years old.

== Analysis ==
In a study conducted by Media Metrix and Jupiter Communications in 2000, there was a 125% growth of girls aged 12–17 years old using the Internet, which was partially credited to Kibu.com.

Several reviewers have suggested Kibu.com was unable to find an audience because they failed to understand their target demographic. Anita Hamilton from Time interviewed several female high school students in Manhattan, New York, about Kibu.com; she noted that girls loved the name of the website and some of the articles, but found the website's format and the haiku design "dull". Other girls found several of the articles and interviews boring and unnecessary. Several editors at Salon.com also criticized Kibu.com's marketing strategy, with some suggesting them to research what girls like or employ them as interns. Ranjay Gulati, Anthony Mayo, and Nitin Nohria suggested that Kibu.com's failure is attributed to having no viable revenues.
