= Deal with It =

Deal with It may refer to:

- "Deal with It" (song), a Corbin Bleu song written by Jay Sean
- "Deal With It", a song by Ashnikko from her 2021 mixtape, Demidevil
- Deal With It (album), the original title for Jay Sean's album My Own Way
- Deal with It (TV series)
- Deal With It!, a 1999 book written by Esther Drill, Heather McDonald, and Rebecca Odes
- Dealing with It!, a 1985 album by Dirty Rotten Imbeciles
- A catchphrase of professional wrestler Dave Bautista
