= Gurl.com =

Former social networking website

- Logo used since 2011
- Website type: Zine; Online community; Social networking service
- Available in: English
- Founded: May 1996; 30 years ago
- Dissolved: November 2018; 8 years ago
- Headquarters: New York City, United States
- Country of origin: United States
- Area served: Worldwide
- Founders: Rebecca Odes; Esther Drill; Heather McDonald
- Parent: Hearst Magazines
- Website: gurl.com at the Wayback Machine (archived November 30, 2018)
- Commercial: Yes
- Registration: Optional (required for contributions and message board)
- Launched: May 1996; 30 years ago
- Current status: Defunct
- Native client on: Web browser

Gurl.com (pronounced "girl dot com"; formerly stylized as gURL.com from 1996 to 2011) was an American website for teenage girls that was online from 1996 to 2018. It was created by Rebecca Odes, Esther Drill, and Heather McDonald as a resource centered on teen advice, body image, female sexuality, and other teen-related concerns. First published as an online zine, it later expanded into an online community. At one point, it provided a free e-mail and web hosting service, known as Gurlmail and Gurlpages respectively.

Clothing retailer Delia's purchased the site in 1997; it was sold to PriMedia in 2001, who in turn sold it to iVillage in 2003. Alloy, later rebranded as Defy Media, acquired it from iVillage in 2009. The website ceased activity after Defy Media's closure in 2018 and was acquired by Hearst Magazines, who redirected it to Seventeen's website.

As one of the first major websites aimed at teenage girls in the United States, Gurl.com was heavily associated with zine culture and third-wave feminism; it was also used in academia to study the online behavior of teenage girls. Unlike teen magazines in the 1990s, Gurl.com was known for its humorous tone, unconventional approach to teen-related topics compared to mainstream media, and contributions from its audience (such as editorials and artwork). The popularity of Gurl.com led the creators to co-author three teen advice books, the first being Deal With It! A Whole New Approach to Your Body, Brain, and Life as a gURL (1999).

Gurl.com won the I.D. Magazine Award for Interactive Media in 1997 and a Webby Award in 1998; its founders received the New York Magazine Award in 1997 for their work on the website. Gurl.com was also met with privacy concerns, as well as criticism from conservative and anti-pornography advocates for its sex-positive stance and sex education resources.

== History ==
Gurl.com's logo from 1996 to 2011

Rebecca Odes and Esther Drill, childhood friends from West Orange, New Jersey, conceived the idea of managing a magazine while they were in high school, as teenagers in the 1980s. Dissatisfied with the teen magazines available to them growing up, they sought to curate alternative media that would properly address the concerns of teenage girls. In 1995, while they were graduate students at the Interactive Telecommunications Program at New York University, they, along with fellow student Heather McDonald, decided to form a female-positive online space aimed at teenagers, as they felt the Internet lacked such communities in the 1990s. They wanted to create an uncensored resource for girls, with features similar to those in a teen magazine, but also wanted to build a community centered on female interests, with peer advice and opinions from other girls. Gurl.com was then created as Odes, Drill, and McDonald's Master's Thesis project. The name of the website combined the word "girl" with the acronym "URL". The logo of the website contained a closed fist with painted nails. The website was launched in May 1996.

After Gurl.com's initial launch, the website was included as a member of EstroNet, a web portal designed to drive traffic to independently owned websites created by women. The clothing retailer Delia's approached Odes, Drill, and McDonald with an acquisition offer and purchased the website in December 1997. Odes, Drill, and McDonald continued to work on the website from Delia's offices. Gurl.com was included as part of the website network iTurf (Delia's online subsidiary) in an attempt to launch an e-commerce market targeting Generation Y. Gurl.com was initially launched as a non-commercial website, but it began selling merchandise from Delia's catalogue beginning in May 1998. On September 2, 1999, iTurf partnered with America Online to feature content from Gurl.com on their website in a section called AOgirL. In May 2000, Gurl.com sponsored Take Back the Decks: An Evening of Women in Underground Music, an all-female music festival held at Lighthouse Frying Pan in New York City, New York. From November 16 to November 21, 2000, Gurl.com held the Movers, Shakers, and Media Makers Film Festival at the Pioneer Theater in East Village, Manhattan, with Kim Peirce, Christine Vachon, and Nancy Savoca as guests.

Following the dot-com bubble burst in 2000, Delia's sold or closed down all of their Internet properties in late November 2000, with the exception of Gurl.com. On November 23, 2000, Gurl.com was redesigned with less focus on e-commerce. In May 2001, PriMedia, the parent company of Seventeen, acquired Gurl.com in an attempt to expand its teen-centered properties. In August 2003, while downsizing and paying off its debts, PriMedia sold Gurl.com to iVillage, with Drill and McDonald joining staff. In 2005, Gurl.com opened its first mobile store powered by M-Qube, selling ringtones and wallpapers for mobile phones.

In 2009, Alloy acquired Gurl.com as part of their strategy to build a digital entertainment hub aimed at teenagers and young adults. Alloy later relaunched Gurl.com in 2011 with a new logo, containing a cursive font with the "u" shaped as a heart. Once Alloy merged with Breaker Media and became Defy Media in 2013, Gurl.com focused on video content and had a YouTube channel. The website ceased activity after 2018 with the closure of Defy Media. Once Gurl.com was redirected to Seventeen's website, Hearst Magazines later announced on February 15, 2019 that they acquired Clevver, including Gurl.com, which Defy Media had grouped with Clevver's network. In 2020, Jamie Petitto, a video editor for Gurl.com from 2012 until its closure, stated in a video post on her social media accounts that Gurl.com had stopped updating since 2017. She also stated that she had offered to buy Gurl.com from Defy Media but could not meet their demand of $3 million.

== Content ==
=== Zine ===
"Our site is really different from Seventeen magazine. We talk about some of the same topics because they are things that matter to girls but we talk about them in a very different way. Gurl is very much about NOT telling girls what to do, not providing formulaic answers, etc., more about showing girls that there are many, many possibilities and ways of being, not just one right or "cool" way."

— Rebecca Odes, CNN

Gurl.com drew inspiration from teen magazines, and its initial launch used a zine format. The website's intended demographic was girls aged 13 or older. Unlike contemporary online communities aimed at young women in the 1990s, Gurl.com had an edgier appearance, using a frank and nonjudgmental approach to address topics such as dating, health, and beauty. Gurl.com also directly addressed topics such as female sexuality, which according to The Cut was not commonly seen in traditional media aimed at teenagers in the 1990s. Early content parodied and satirized mainstream teen magazines. The website initially used drawings of women instead of photos to emphasize body positivity and to avoid body image concerns.

Content on the website was organized into topics such as "Deal With It" (daily life), "Looks Aren't Everything" (fashion and beauty), "Where Do I Go From Here?" (career), and sports. When Gurl.com was given a new design on November 23, 2000, "Stop, Look, and Listen" (shopping) and "Movers, Shakers, and Media Makers" (celebrities and other women in media) were added as two new sections. "The Boob Files" had first-person essays written about breasts that were submitted by contributors. The website also had an advice column run by McDonald, titled "Help Me, Heather."

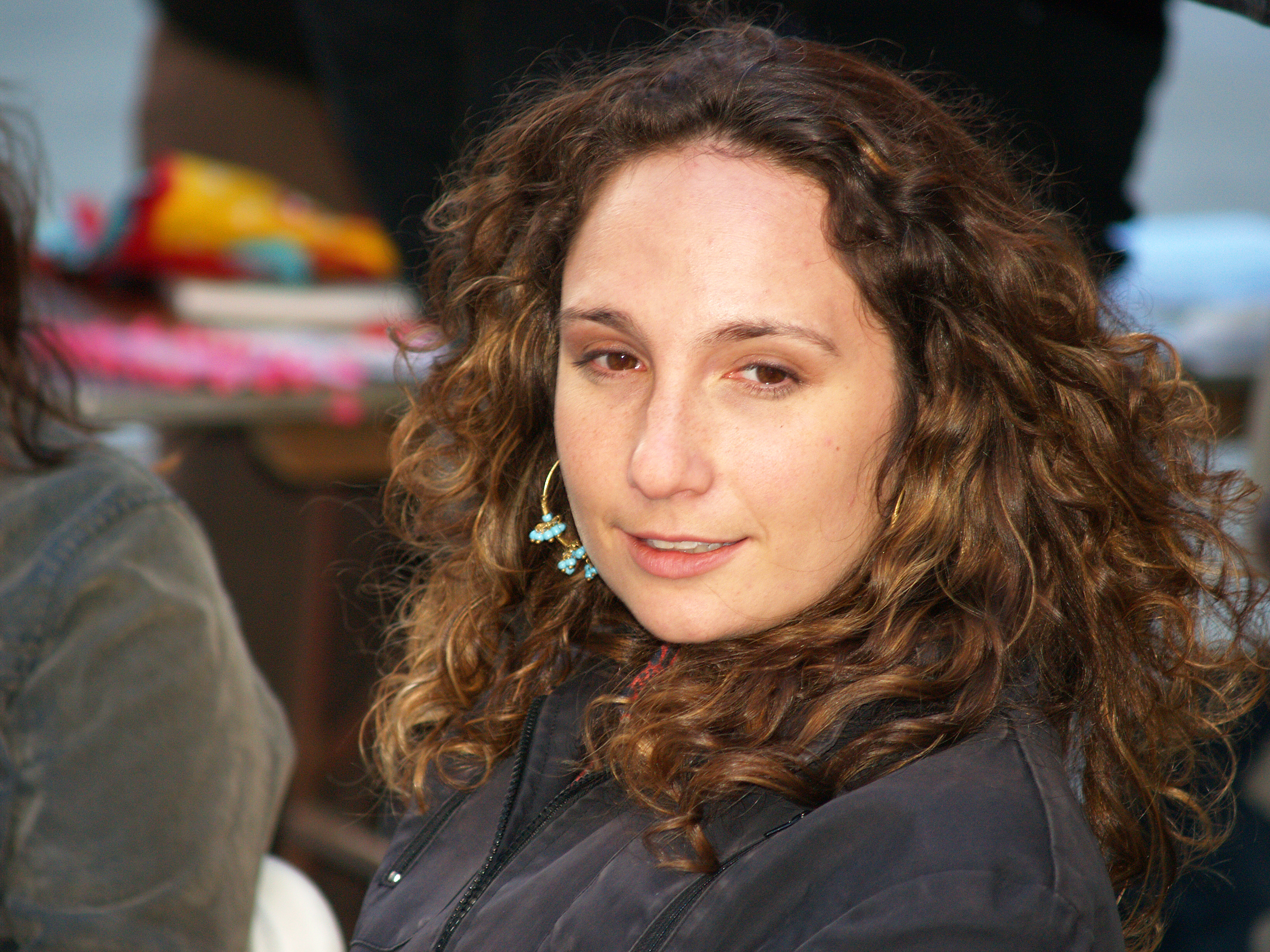
Girl Stories by Lauren Weinstein (pictured in 2007) was serialized on Gurl.com.

Because Odes, Drill, and McDonald believed that girls prefer creating to being consumers, the website allowed contributions from its users, such as comics, poems, opinions on current events, and reviews. For the same reason, they limited contributions from celebrities, as the website was intended to be a counter against aspirational fantasy. One of Gurl.com's notable contributions from its readers was its comics section, which included serializations such as Those Sucky Emotions and Mizbehavior, both initially listed in the "Deal With It" topic. Other comics included Girl Stories by Lauren Weinstein; Fifteen Revolutions and Rachel the Great & Tuna by Rachel Nabors; and Girls in Love and I Heart Sex by Martina Fugazzotto.

During Alloy's (later rebranded as Defy Media) acquisition of Gurl.com, the company shifted the website's focus towards video editorials. Jamie Petitto was hired to be a host for the video content from 2012 to 2017. She primarily hosted a DIY video series called Do It, Gurl on Gurl.com's YouTube channel, which was nominated for a Streamy Award in 2013.

=== Features ===
While Gurl.com could be accessed without an account, registration was required to submit content and participate in the chat room and message board. Registration was free, and users were strongly advised to create a non-identifying alias to keep them anonymous. The message board, known as the "Shout-out Boards", were where users could interact with each other and exchange advice. Gurl.com also had an online avatar-based text chat room server, known as the Gurl Palace, accessible through the computer program The Palace.

As well as messaging features, Gurl.com featured online games. Some of the early game content satirized beauty standards, such as the game "Hairy Gurl". Later games stuck to Gurl.com's concept of acknowledging girls as creators instead of consumers, such as "Make Your Own Rock Band", "Make Your Own Reality TV Show", and "Try the Prom Dress Selector". It also had personality quizzes, with a well-documented one being "Paper Doll Psychology", where users could dress a paper doll and receive an assessment on their personality based on their clothing choices.

During Delia's ownership from 1997 to 2001, Gurl.com provided an e-mail service through Gurlmail.com and web hosting through Gurlpages.com, both free services owned by Lycos. Many users used Gurlpages to host zines, particularly about female sexuality. Others used Gurlpages to host their creative works, such as poetry, and rants about their daily lives. Websites hosted on Gurlpages were part of Gurl.com's network and allowed users to easily connect with one another.

=== Publications ===
Following the success of Gurl.com, Odes, Drill, and McDonald received a book deal through a partnership with Scholastic. They published a series of teen advice books based on the editorial content on the website and also included conversations found on Gurl.com's message board. The first book, Deal With It! A Whole New Approach to Your Body, Brain, and Life as a gURL, was released on September 1, 1999; it offered advice on puberty, queer identities, sex, eating disorders, drug use, and mental health, with a list of resources on each topic. To promote the book, Odes, Drill, and McDonald launched an accompanying website, DealWithIt.com, which hosted an online version of the resources. Deal With It! was received favorably, most reviewers praising the book as a valuable resource about sexual health as well as its tone and presentation; some critics cautioned that parents might not find some of the content appropriate and advised that the book was not suitable for younger readers. Deal With It! was listed at #82 on the American Library Association's Top 100 Banned/Challenged Books from 2000 to 2009, with several organizations challenging the book due to its LGBT-friendly and sex-positive content. Deal With It! became a national bestseller, selling 100,000 copies in the United States by January 2000, and was awarded the I.D. Magazine Award in the Graphics category in July 2000.

Deal With It! was followed by The Looks Book: A Whole New Approach to Beauty, Body Image, and Style on October 1, 2002, which examined beauty standards throughout the ages. Publishers Weekly described the artwork as "whimsical" and the book as both intelligent and humorous, suggesting that it presented a message of empowerment.

The final book, Where Do I Go from Here?: Getting a Life After High School, was released in 2004. The book discussed topics such as entering adulthood, managing finances, alternatives to college, and other social issues in college life, such as incompatible roommates, date rape, and binge drinking. Britta Hays from Tampa Bay Times praised the book for profiling options after high school without bias. Harry Wessel from The Orlando Sentinel described the book as one that would help teenagers make good choices about their future and said that, despite its branding, its advice was also applicable to men.

== Analysis ==
=== Critical reception ===
Gurl.com was praised for being a positive community on topics such as female sexuality, queer identity, and body positivity, as well as its inclusion of peer advice from teenage girls, by media outlets such as The Cut, Glamour, and Los Angeles Times. Janelle Brown from Salon.com noted that the accessibility of sex education online had prepared young girls and also allowed them their own sexual agency. Despite the acclaim, Los Angeles Times and Common Sense Media suggested Gurl.com was more appropriate for an older audience. In 1999, the website had approximately 800,000 visitors per month. In 2001, approximately 40% of girls who regularly used the Internet in the United States visited the website.

Gurl.com was also met with criticisms over its sex-positive stance from conservative groups. In 1999, Salon.com stated that anti-pornography advocates cited concerns that young girls discussing and having accessibility to sex information would lead to an increase in underage sexual activity and be harmful to their development. Abstinence advocate Coleen Kelly Mast argued that Gurl.com gave a one-sided view of human sexuality, claiming that the information would not help lead to "satisfaction in marriage". Carol Platt Liebau named Gurl.com as part of her criticisms against the United States' "sex-obsessed" culture, criticizing the website for excluding religious and moral discussions about sex as well as for ignoring the opinions of teenage girls who chose to be abstinent. Miriam Grossman included Gurl.com and Deal With It! in her criticisms of sex education, calling the website "offensive material" for including information such as BDSM, sex positions, and gender identities.

Among other criticisms, parents and scholars expressed concern over Gurl.com collecting information from its users and disclosing them to third-party advertisers to study consumer habits, with The American Prospect naming their personality quizzes as an example of acquiring personal data. In 2015, the Canadian Broadcasting Company included Gurl.com among 1,494 websites and mobile apps that were privacy concerns, as it allowed children to unknowingly list too much information about themselves. Anita Hamilton from Time surveyed several female high school students in Manhattan, New York, and out of the four teen websites shown to them, the students liked Gurl.com the least, citing its "cluttered" design as partly the reason.

=== Awards ===
List of awards given to Gurl.com, with year, name of award, category, nominee/work, and result
Year	Award	Category	Nominee/Work	Result
1997	I.D. Magazine Annual Design Review for Interactive Media	—N/a	Gurl.com	Won
1997	New York Magazine Award	—N/a	Esther Drill, Heather McDonald, and Rebecca Odes	Won
1998	Webby Awards	Living	Gurl.com	Won
2013	3rd Streamy Awards	Best DIY or How-To Series	Do It, Gurl	Nominated

=== Use in academia ===
Gurl.com has been used in studies about online behaviors and sexual identities of teenage girls. In a study conducted by Media Metrix and Jupiter Communications in 2000, there was a 125% growth of girls aged 12–17 years old using the Internet, which was partially credited to Gurl.com. In a study done by professors Barbara Duncan and Kevin Leander in the same year, they observed that because Gurl.com already had an established network, girls who hosted their website at Gurlpages could easily connect with one another and receive feedback on their work. In 2005, scholar Sharon Mazzarella noted that Gurl.com was among the websites that helped girls be creative and empowered, though there was later increasing moral panic surrounding how harmful messages may influence them.

Scholars Ashley D. Grisso and David Weiss noted that users on Gurl.com's message board often discussed their interest in sex, usually respectfully as per the established norm on the website. In spite of this, many discussions about sex on the website were related to male pleasure. Gurl.com encouraged sexual expression, but some users were quick to shame others who disapproved of premarital sex or discussed their sex lives in detail, downplaying individual sexual agency. A study published in the Journal of Computer-Mediated Communication in 2006 found Gurl.com to be the best example of a female-centric website that encouraged critical thinking skills in young girls through their discussions on current events.

Gurl.com has also been used as an example of the commercialization of the Internet, as well as recognizing young women from Generation Y as a viable marketing demographic. It was named as a site that inspired the growth of websites owned by teenage girls, creating a potential advertising market worth US$15 billion in 2000. Duncan and Leander argued that Gurl.com created spaces of both "resistance and conformity", as people who had websites on Gurlpages both expressed themselves in creative writing yet also listed personal information identifying their demographics and consumer habits. Scholar Leslie Regan Shade used Gurl.com as an example of commodification and commercialization of a community in the 1990s, when women were being recognized as a marketing demographic for e-commerce. Echoing Duncan and Leander, she commented that while Gurl.com had a disclaimer stating that their views do not represent their advertisers, the website may have been "packaged for a homogeneous idyllic audience commodity", which contrasts with the "utopian sentiments" of an online community. Gurl.com was used as an example of stealth marketing in teaching media literacy about advertising.

== Legacy ==
Gurl.com is known for being one of the first major websites aimed at teenage girls in the United States during the 1990s. It was also known for its association and contributions to third-wave feminism, riot grrl, and zine culture in the 1990s. Gurl.com's honest and frank discussions about teen issues inspired teen magazines and other female-centered websites to adopt a similar approach. Its branding was also tied to Generation Y identity.
