= ChickClick =

American women's website

- Logo
- Website type: Zine; Online community
- Available in: English
- Founded: February 1998; 28 years ago
- Dissolved: 2002; 24 years ago
- Headquarters: San Francisco, {{{location_country}}}
- Country of origin: United States
- Area served: Worldwide
- Founder: Heidi Swanson
- Parent: Snowball
- Website: ChickClick at the Wayback Machine (archived May 19, 2001)
- Commercial: Yes
- Registration: Optional (required for message board)
- Launched: February 1998; 28 years ago
- Current status: Defunct
- Native client on: Web browser

ChickClick was an American website for women that was online from 1998 to 2002. It was created by Heidi Swanson as a web portal for websites created by young women. The website also served as an online community, with a message board and Internet radio program called ChickClick Radio. It also provided a free e-mail and web hosting service, known as Chickmail and Chickpages respectively.

After ChickClick's launch in February 1998, it merged with EstroNet in October 1998. After the dot-com bubble burst in 2000, the website became defunct in 2002 and now redirects to IGN's website.

During its years online, ChickClick was associated with zine culture and third-wave feminism. It was nominated for two Webby Awards in 2001.

== History ==
Wanting to create alternative media for young women online, Heidi Swanson created ChickClick when she was 25 years old. She pitched the idea to Chris Anderson, the head of Imagine Media who also owned IGN, requesting a computer to allow herself and her younger sister, Heather, to build the website. At the time, Swanson had quit her job as a web designer after working for six weeks due to focusing on her master's degree at Stanford University.

Shortly after ChickClick's initial launch in February 1998, it merged with EstroNet, a network of female-oriented Internet properties, in October. ChickClick then divided its content between MissClick, targeted towards teenagers, and EstroClick, targeted towards adults. Afterwards, ChickClick began expanding on its web services, such as its free e-mail and web hosting services. Swanson explained that the web hosting, in addition to ChickClick's message boards, was to scaffold young women into using technology to both create and consume content.

In February 1999, ChickClick became managed by Affiliation Networks, a company created as an offshoot of Imagine Media focusing on its online properties, whose name was later changed into Snowball in August 1999. In addition, ChickClick sponsored the music festival Lilith Fair. The website also had plans to launch news channels, including SheWire, a technology-related news channel aimed at women.

In 2000, ChickClick launched an online radio program called ChickClick Radio. Following the dot-com bubble burst, ChickClick faced several employee lay-offs, and both Swanson sisters left the staff to work on Kibu.com. In 2002, Snowball announced that they were closing ChickClick, citing "changes in the economy" as its reason as a reference to its financial losses.

== Content ==
ChickClick was launched as a zine and web portal aimed at women, featuring links to content that parodied mainstream teen and women's magazines. Websites that were part of ChickClick's network included the Disgruntled Housewife; Riotgrrl; GrrlGamer; and Bimbionic. Unlike general women's magazines at the time, ChickClick was seen as "edgy", with personal content and an aesthetic combining riot grrrl visuals with "reclaimed girl culture" such as Hello Kitty and "ironic" artwork from the 1950s.

ChickClick also featured a message board, where users could participate. It also had a free e-mail and web hosting service that was powered by Lycos. The e-mail service Chickmail and web hosting service Chickpages were advertised to the teenage demographic, while Estromail and Estropages were advertised to the adult demographic. Websites hosted on Chickpages and Estropages were part of ChickClick's network, and the owners of ChickClick would profit from the advertisements.

=== EstroNet ===
Like ChickClick, EstroNet was created as a collaborative network of websites and zines aimed at women. It was intended to drive traffic towards independent websites created by women. In addition, Heather Irwin, one of its founders, planned for EstroNet to host original content, such as spotlighting women in the technology industry. EstroNet's member sites included Maxi, its first member; and HUES (acronym for Hear Us Emerging Sisters), founded by Ophira Edut and aimed at women of color; Bust, a print zine; Gurl.com; Minxmag, an online zine sponsored by Pseudo.com; Women's Room, an online zine on Tripod; and Wench.

The founders of EstroNet were familiar with Heidi Swanson since 1995, and as ChickClick had corporate funding, which EstroNet lacked, they allowed Swanson to take over the website. After merging with ChickClick in October 1998, EstroNet's original content was divided into its own category, EstroClick, aimed at older women.

== Analysis ==
=== Critical reception ===
In 1998, ChickClick received more than a million visits a month. Entertainment Weekly gave the website a B+, stating that both ChickClick and EstroNet had "useful information, provocative thought, and handsome visuals laid out with clarity and taste" but that its effect can be hard to take seriously. ChickClick was also one of the websites criticized for having sexual information, and in 1999, anti-pornography advocates cited concerns that this would lead to more underage sexual activity and cause harmful development in young girls.

=== Awards ===
Year	Award	Category	Nominees	Result
2001	Webby Awards	Community	ChickClick	Nominated
2001	Webby Awards	Living	ChickClick	Nominated

=== Use in academia ===
ChickClick has been used as a study of zine culture and women's media in the 1990s. Scholars Tasha Oren and Andrea Press named ChickClick as one of the websites that encouraged female participation on the Internet. They also noticed that while ChickClick was active as part of the zine culture, it was branded as alternative content for women and separated itself from radical feminist zines.
