= Deal With It! =

1999 teen advice/sex education book

Deal With It! A Whole New Approach to Your Body, Brain, and Life as a gURL
- First edition cover of the English version
- Author: Esther Drill; Heather McDonald; Rebecca Odes
- Illustrator: Rebecca Odes
- Language: English
- Subject: Self-help; Sex education
- Genre: Nonfiction
- Publisher: Pocket Books
- Publication date: September 1, 1999
- Publication place: United States
- Media type: Print (paperback)
- Pages: 320
- ISBN: 9780671041571
- Followed by: The Looks Book: A Whole New Approach to Beauty, Body Image, and Style
- Website: dealwithit.com at the Wayback Machine (archived May 30, 2002)

Deal With It! A Whole New Approach to Your Body, Brain, and Life as a gURL is a 1999 teen advice and sex education book written by Esther Drill, Heather McDonald, and Rebecca Odes, the creators of the American website Gurl.com. Using the same format of the original website, the book was published by Pocket Books and released on September 1, 1999.

Deal With It! became a national bestseller and also won the I.D. Magazine Award in 2000. It was praised for being informative, frank, and having a nonjudgmental approach discussing topics such as puberty and sexuality. It was also met with criticism from several conservative groups and has been challenged for its LGBT-friendly and sex-positive content.

== Background ==
Esther Drill, Heather McDonald, and Rebecca Odes launched the website Gurl.com in May 1996 as their Master's Thesis project while they were graduate students at the Interactive Telecommunications Program at New York University. The website soon became one of the first major websites aimed at teenage girls in the United States. In 1998, media outlets announced they were publishing a book based on their website through a partnership with Scholastic. Much like Gurl.com, Drill, McDonald, and Odes intended for the book to be a resource for teenage girls that would properly address their concerns and educate them on life choices.

The book, Deal With It!, is marketed to mature teens and young women in their early 20s due to its frank discussions about sexuality; however, the authors stated that they believe there is no specific age for any girl learning sexual information.

== Contents ==
=== Format ===
Named after "Deal With It", one of the sections on daily life on Gurl.com, the book of the same name is divided into four sections: "Body", which discusses body image, nutrition, and exercise; "Sexuality", which discusses sexual health and the emotional and societal issues involved; "Brain", which discusses emotional struggles such as eating disorders, underachieving, and suicidal tendencies; and "Life", which discusses relationships with family, popularity, and romance. Each of the four sections included subsections such as "What's Up Down There," "Those Sucky Emotions," and "Understanding STDs." The book offers advice on teen-related concerns such as puberty, queer identities, sex, eating disorders, drug use, and mental health, based on information screened by experts. Each topic also includes a list of resources. The book also uses the same humorous yet informative tone found on the website. While the authors included their own commentary on each topic, chat conversations from users on Gurl.com were also included with the text.

Deal With It! presents information in the same format used on Gurl.com, with "cartoon" icons and bold colors used as the book's illustrations. Odes was in charge of the art direction of the book, with Georgia Rucker in charge of design. The book was put together using Adobe Illustrator, QuarkXPress, Flash, and Streamline. Similar to the website, the authors opted to use illustrations of women instead of photos to avoid issues with body image. The cover of the book shows the back of a girl opening her trenchcoat, and the other side of the cover reveals she is wearing a bra and panties underneath.

=== Publication history ===
To promote Deal With It!, Odes, Drill, and McDonald launched an accompanying website, DealWithIt.com, including an online version of the resources. It was published by Pocket Books and released on September 1, 1999, with a retail price of US$15. The book was later released in the United Kingdom in 2001.

== Reception ==
Women's Wear Daily described the book as "witty" and that it carries a "non-judgmental and upbeat tone." Natalie Angier from The New York Times described Deal With It! as "funny", with "bold colors, cartoon icons and choppy text blocks." While Deal With It! was praised for being frank and nonjudgmental, editors at The New York Times and Los Angeles Times, and Publishers Weekly also warned that some topics may not be appropriate for its target audience, nor a conservative audience. Jennifer Howard from The Washington Post found the "Life" section of the book the most ambitious and described the book as a way to help girls look after themselves. John Malam from The Guardian found the book commendable, describing it to have advice that empowers its readers instead of lecturing them.

Jane Gordon wrote in the Hartford Courant that a parent had expressed disgust with the book and suggested that topics about sex should be discussed between parents and their children; however, the authors noted that teenagers preferred the book, as they find it embarrassing to discuss sex with their parents. Psychiatrist Miriam Grossman included Deal With It! in her criticisms of sex education, calling the book "offensive material" for including information such as BDSM. The book was also met with opposition by The Library Patrons of Texas and Parents Protecting the Minds of Children from Arkansas for including LGBT content. In 2009, the West Bend Citizens for Safe Libraries challenged to ban the book from West Bend Community Library, claiming it to be "pornography." Deal With It! is listed at #82 on the American Library Association's Top 100 Banned/Challenged Books from 2000 to 2009.

Deal With It! became a national bestseller, selling 100,000 copies in the United States by January 2000. By March 2000, the book sold 500,000 copies. In July 2000, Deal With It! was awarded the I.D. Magazine Award in the Graphics category.
