= Rebecca Odes =

American musician and writer (born 1969)

- Born: September 11, 1969 (age 57); West Orange, New Jersey, United States
- Other name: Odes
- Education: West Orange High School: Vassar College; New York University
- Occupations: Media entrepreneur; author
- Years active: 1987–present
- Spouse: Craig Kanarick (m. 2001)
- Children: 2
- Musical career
- Genre: Alternative rock
- Instruments: Vocals; bass guitar; guitar
- Labels: Homestead Records; Merge Records
- Formerly of: Love Child

Rebecca Odes (born September 11, 1969) is an American media entrepreneur, author, and former musician. From 1987 to 1992, she was the bassist and vocalist for the band Love Child. In 1994, she debuted as a solo artist under the stage name Odes with the song "Meltaway", later releasing the extended play Me and My Big Mouth (1996).

Odes is the co-founder and creative director of the now-defunct website Gurl.com. She was awarded a New York Magazine Award in 1997 in recognition of her work. She also co-authored three books based on content from Gurl.com, beginning with Deal With It! A Whole New Approach to Your Body, Brain, and Life as a gURL (1999). Following her work on Gurl.com, Odes co-wrote the book From the Hips: A Comprehensive, Open-Minded, Uncensored, Totally Honest Guide to Pregnancy, Birth and Becoming a Parent (2007). In 2013, she also co-founded Wifey.tv. In 2016, she was listed under Forbes Forty Over 40.

== Early and personal life ==
Odes was born in West Orange, New Jersey, in the United States, and she is Jewish. She is childhood friends with Esther Drill; the two attended West Orange High School, where they both participated in the French club, Ski club and the Cauldron school newspaper. Odes attended and graduated from Vassar College. After graduation, she worked for an indie music magazine in Boston, Massachusetts.

Odes attended the School of the Art Institute of Chicago to study painting, but she dropped out due to her activities with Love Child. After Love Child's disbandment, Odes worked as a painting and studio assistant, as well as a design assistant for a Christmas tree bow manufacturer. After learning how to use design programs on her computer, she later enrolled at the Interactive Telecommunications Program at New York University and graduated with a master's degree.

Odes married Craig Kanarick, the co-founder of Razorfish, on October 27, 2001, at the Angel Orensanz Center. The two had met in 1996 when Odes took an interaction design course that Kanarick was teaching at New York University. Odes and Kanarick have two children.

== Career ==
=== Music career ===
At the end of her freshman year in Vassar College, Odes formed the band Love Child with two other students and was the band's bassist and vocalist. On June 20, 1994, Odes (under her last name only) released "Meltaway" as a 7-inch vinyl single through Merge Records, with "Honey Gets Hard" as its B-side. On February 20, 1996, Odes released her extended play, Me and My Big Mouth.

=== Writing career ===
As high school students, Odes and her childhood friend Esther Drill conceived the idea of curating their own magazine with alternative media after noticing that the teen magazines available to them did not properly address their concerns. While they were graduate students at the Interactive Telecommunications Program at New York University, they, along with classmate Heather McDonald, decided to form a female-positive online space aimed at teenagers, as the Internet lacked communities for girls in the 1990s. Gurl.com was then created as Odes, Drill, and McDonald's Master's Thesis project. The website was launched in May 1996. Odes acted as the creative director of Gurl.com. She, along with Drill and McDonald, were given the New York Magazine Award in 1997 for their work on the website.

Throughout the years of working on Gurl.com, Odes, Drill, and McDonald released three books based on the content of their website through a partnership with Scholastic. The first book, Deal With It! A Whole New Approach to Your Body, Brain, and Life as a gURL, was released on September 1, 1999, becoming a national bestseller and selling 100,000 copies in the United States by January 2000. It was awarded the I.D. Magazine Award in the Graphics category in July 2000. The second book, The Looks Book: A Whole New Approach to Beauty, Body Image, and Style, was released on October 1, 2002. The final book, Where Do I Go from Here?: Getting a Life After High School, was released in 2004. Following her work on Gurl.com, Odes co-wrote the book From the Hips: A Comprehensive, Open-Minded, Uncensored, Totally Honest Guide to Pregnancy, Birth and Becoming a Parent with Ceridwen Morris, with the book releasing on May 1, 2007.

In 2013, Odes founded Wifey.tv with Joey Soloway, an Internet-based platform for women. In the same year, she was a co-contributor to the book Unscrolled with Sam Lipsyte in a segment titled "10 Commandments."

In 2016, Odes became the executive producer of the film The Skinny. She was also listed in Forbes Forty Over 40 in the same year. In 2018, Odes co-founded CherryPicks, a review aggregator website for female and non-binary content, with Miranda Bailey.

== Discography ==
=== Extended plays ===
Title	Year	Album details	Peak chart positions	Sales	Certifications
Title	Year	Album details	US	Sales	Certifications
Me and My Big Mouth	1996	Released: February 20, 1996; Label: Merge Records; Formats: CD	—	—N/a	—N/a
"—" denotes releases that did not chart.

=== Singles ===
Title	Year	Peak chart positions	Sales	Album
Title	Year	US	Sales	Album
"Meltaway"	1994	—	—	Non-album single
"—" denotes releases that did not chart.

== Publications ==
=== As author ===
Year	Title	Publisher	ISBN	Notes
1999	Deal With It! A Whole New Approach to Your Body, Brain, and Life as a gURL	Pocket Books	ISBN 9780671041571	Co-author with Esther Drill and Heather McDonald; illustrator
2002	The Looks Book: A Whole New Approach to Beauty, Body Image, and Style	Penguin Books	ISBN 9780142002117	Co-author with Esther Drill and Heather McDonald; illustrator
2004	Where Do I Go from Here?: Getting a Life After High School	Penguin Books	ISBN 9780142002148	Co-author with Esther Drill and Heather McDonald; illustrator
2007	From the Hips: A Comprehensive, Open-Minded, Uncensored, Totally Honest Guide to Pregnancy, Birth and Becoming a Parent	Three Rivers Press	ISBN 9780307237088	Co-author with Ceridwen Morris; illustrator

=== As contributor ===
Year	Title	Publisher	ISBN	Notes
2013	Unscrolled: 54 Writers and Artists Wrestle with the Torah	Workman Publishing Company	ISBN 9780761169192	"10 Commandments"; co-contributor with Sam Lipsyte
