= Bolt (website) =

Former social networking site

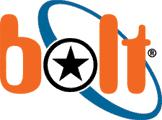
- Website type: Social network service
- Available in: English
- Owners: Fundbolt, LLC
- Creators: Dan Pelson; Jane Mount
- Website: www.bolt.com
- Commercial: Yes
- Registration: Required for most services
- Launched: 1996
- Current status: Inactive

Bolt was a social networking and video website active from 1996 to 2007 before reopening in April 2008. It was shut down for a period of one year due to copyright violations leading to bankruptcy. It was acquired by new owners on January 4, 2008 and operated successfully for several months before announcing plans to go offline in October 2008.

== 1996–2006 ==
In 1996, Bolt.com was founded as a teen community by Dan Pelson and Jane Mount as part of Concrete Media. It was among the first social networking sites to appear on the Internet. It offered content that included daily horoscopes, chat rooms, message boards, tagbooks (a knowledge market feature), photo albums, internet radio, browser games, blogs, e-cards, an instant messenger service, a clubs feature (giving people with similar interests a common message board), and badges (a system of awards for user profiles). An email service was hosted, but it was discontinued due to email companies such as Yahoo and Google providing between 1 and nearly 3 gigabytes of email storage for free, rendering Bolt's email service obsolete. This was done without notifying its email subscribers. Bolt was also one of the first sites to give its members their own web page. In 2002, the badges became more sponsor-based, which led to Bolt becoming more commercial with an increase of ads into the users' activities. Company badges included Verizon Wireless, Gillette, and Sony.

Bolt was originally marketed towards teenagers to create content, meet people, and play games in a safe and age-appropriate environment. As members aged and stayed with the site, more members were college students and between ages 18–24. In 2005, Bolt.com launched its second iteration, Boltfolio. Calling itself the leader of the "cult of creativity", Boltfolio intended to provide a one-stop shop for creative users to upload their own photos, videos, and music, as well as write blogs or record directly from a webcam. The goal of Boltfolio was to provide a set of tools that would attract users of creative sites such as DeviantArt, YouTube, and Flickr.

== 2006–2009 ==
In December 2005, Bolt Media finalized a deal to purchase InterMedia Inc., a small company focused on a video-sharing site, Yashi. Yashi and Boltfolio were integrated into one site, and in March 2006 Bolt Media opted to focus the company on this new property. Boltfolio became Bolt.com, moving the existing Bolt.com site to Bolt2.com. As 2006 wore on, creative Bolt members were featured less frequently on the site, taking a back seat to videos produced by Bolt staff, popular music videos, and viral videos that also were appearing on competing video sites.

bolt2.com logo

On October 17, 2006, one week after announcing a revenue-sharing deal with YouTube, Universal Music filed suit against Bolt Media and another video site, Grouper. Universal contended that both sites allowed and encouraged their users to swap unlicensed music videos. Several weeks later, Bolt removed the music section from their site, without any explanation.

In February 2007, Bolt Media announced that it would be selling itself to GoFish, another online video company, for $30 million. According to Aaron Cohen, Bolt's CEO, Bolt would once again change its focus from uploaded content to content creation, saying that the former was no longer "interesting business". Cohen and Bolt president Jay Gould are also involved in a new project, called WikiYou, which has received seed funding from First Round Capital and Mayfield Fund.

On March 30, 2007, it was announced that Bolt2.com would shut down on April 6, 2007, ending more than 10 years of operations. This letter posted on the site to members of the community:

"Well, the time had come. We have decided that it is time to officially say good-bye to Bolt2. In the past few years Bolt Media has explored new ideas, and grown in a different direction. As we continue to move in this direction it has become necessary that we need to make some difficult choices.

One of which is the closure of Bolt2. Although we value our loyal members, we are clearly moving in a new direction and need to focus our energies there. We recognize that many of you have been on the site for up to 10 years, and would like to thank you for your support and for allowing us to be a part of your lives. We hope you are able to take the time to reflect on the people who you may have met through Bolt2 and maintain these friendships after the site is down.

Much like pulling off a band-aid, the closure will be short and hopefully not too painful. The site will officially close on Friday, April 6th at noon (eastern standard time)."

Again, we would like to express our gratitude for your continued support of Bolt2. You have been a valuable part of our lives, and we hope to see you on Bolt in the future.

bolt.com logo from 2006 to 2008

On July 30, 2007, Digital Music News reported that the GoFish buyout of Bolt had been abandoned. This was later confirmed by GoFish in a press release.

Unable to withstand a lawsuit from copyright holders, Bolt.com filed for bankruptcy, and the site was shut down August 14, 2007.

On April 21, 2008, Bolt.com went live again. The domain was registered to Fundbolt, LLC, a limited liability company based in Irvington, New York.

On August 1, 2008, Bolt.com began integrating aspects of the old Bolt2.com site. Tagbooks, a popular way to ask questions and get answers from the broader community, were relaunched on the site.

On September 30, 2008, Bolt.com was announced to be shutting down once again. It was announced that this was due to the website's resurrection "not working out as they'd hoped". On October 6, 2008, the site was shut down. In December 2008, a notice was put up at the bottom of Bolt.com's old domain announcing the return of Bolt.com social network. The site was later re-opened, hosted by Ning. By July 2011, the site was once again shut down, until bolt3 launched.

== Bolt and American Idol ==
In 2003 Bolt was the official message board for Fox's American Idol during the second season in 2003. This created a swarm of new members signing up to talk only about American Idol. This did not sit well with the veterans, as the quality of discussion on the site greatly dwindled. FOX later created and maintained their own message boards for the third season, but cross promotion still continued with AI sponsored quizzes, avatars, and badges. By the fourth season, the cross promotion was gone, but the message boards were still created and maintained. There were no message boards created for the fifth season of American Idol.
