= Jay Gould (entrepreneur) =

American tech entrepreneur

Jay Gould (born April 1, 1979) is an American tech entrepreneur and the founder & CEO of Yashi. Gould is also an active angel investor, and has backed web-based startups including DogVacay, Tout, Buffer, and Fitocracy.

== Education ==
Gould graduated from Rowan University in 2001, where he earned a bachelor's degree in law and justice studies.

== Career ==
In December 2005, Gould sold his first business to Bolt Media for an undisclosed amount and joined Bolt as its President. At the time of the sale, Gould's websites had 3.3 million U.S. unique visitors, according to comScore Media Metrics.

Under Gould's management, Bolt's revenue grew to $7 million annually with 5.3 million U.S. visitors to the website monthly. In February 2007, he signed an agreement to sell the company for up to $30 million. Just prior to signing the $30 million definitive agreement, Universal Music Group filed a lawsuit against Bolt, MySpace and others for alleged copyright infringement. Bolt was ultimately unable to reach a settlement with Universal Music, which resulted in the termination of Bolt's $30 million acquisition, eventually leading Bolt to file an assignment for the benefit of creditors.

During Gould's tenure at Bolt, he co-founded WikiYou, which raised $500,000 from investors, including Mayfield Fund, First Round Capital, and Reid Hoffman.

=== GamersMedia, later called Yashi ===
In 2007, Gould and his wife Caitlin founded GamersMedia, later called Yashi, the first vertical-advertising network to bring brand advertisers to casual-gaming websites, which at its launch had over 20 million unique visitors across 40 sites. It launched in February 2008.

Yashi became a location-focused advertising platform that targeted mobile and web video advertising.

The company was named to Inc.'s Inc. 5000 list of the Fastest-Growing Private Companies in America for four consecutive years from 2012–2015.

In February 2015, the company was acquired by Nexstar Media Group for $33 million.

=== Foundville ===
In October 2011, Gould launched foundville.com, a video podcast site featuring interviews with successful Internet entrepreneurs. Gould has interviewed founders of companies such as HotOrNot, RockYou, Adify, Mochi Media, CapLinked, The Receivables Exchange, Wikia, SitePoint, and others.

=== Angel investments ===
Gould is an angel investor, with investments in Buffer, CapLinked, Tout, iDoneThis, Fitocracy, and Cadee. In March 2012, Gould was part of a $1 million funding initiative for DogVacay, an online marketplace for residential dog boarding.

In addition to startup capital, Gould also contributes his knowledge and expertise to entrepreneurs. He is a member of the Rowan University Entrepreneurship Program Advisor Council (ENTAC).

== Awards and recognition ==
- On September 20, 2010, Gould was honored as a recipient of the NJBIZ Forty under 40 Award. The award recognizes up-and-coming businesspersons based in the New Jersey-New York area.
- In 2014, Gould was named an Ernst & Young Entrepreneur Of The Year Award finalist in New Jersey.
