= Cool & Collected =

Compilation album by Miles Davis
- Released: September 5, 2006
- Recorded: June 5, 1956 – September 22, 1984
- Genre: Jazz music, hard bop
- Length: 66:07
- Label: Columbia/Legacy
- Producer: George Avakian, Steven Berkowitz, Miles Davis, Charley Drayton, Robert Irving III, Cal Lampley, Teo Macero, Marcel Romano, Pat Thrall, Irving Townsend

Miles Davis chronology
Prestige Profiles, Vol. 1 (2005)	Cool & Collected (2006)	Winter in Europe 1967 (2006)

Cool & Collected is a compilation album by American jazz musician Miles Davis, released in 2006 by Columbia Records and recorded from 1955 through 1984.

== Track listing ==
- "So What" (Davis) – 9:23
- "Summertime [From Porgy and Bess]" (George Gershwin, Ira Gershwin, DuBose Heyward) – 3:20
- "Générique [From Ascenseur pour l'échafaud]" (Davis) – 2:48
- "Stella by Starlight" (Ned Washington, Victor Young) – 4:45
- "Fran-Dance" (Davis) – 5:52
- "Milestones" (Davis) – 5:44
- "'Round Midnight" (Bernie Hanighen, Thelonious Monk, Cootie Williams) – 5:57
- "Bye Bye Blackbird" (Mort Dixon, Ray Henderson) – 7:55
- "Seven Steps to Heaven" (Davis, Victor Feldman) – 6:25
- "Time After Time" (Rob Hyman, Cyndi Lauper) – 3:38
- "E.S.P." (Wayne Shorter) – 5:30
- "Human Nature" (John Bettis, Steve Porcaro) – 4:30
- "It's About That Time [Remix]" (Davis) – 3:40

== Personnel ==
- Julian "Cannonball" Adderley – alto saxophone
- Geri Allen – Fender Rhodes
- George Avakian – production
- Danny Bank – bass clarinet, alto flute
- Bill Barber – tuba
- Bob Belden – digital remastering
- Joe Bennett & the Sparkletones – trombone
- Bob Berg – tenor saxophone
- Steven Berkowitz – executive production, production
- Niko Bolas – engineering
- Stacey Boyle – A&R
- Ron Carter – upright bass
- Bob Cato – photography
- Paul Chambers – upright bass
- Harold Chapman – engineering
- Tom Choi – project manager
- Kenny Clarke – drums
- Jimmy Cleveland – trombone
- Johnny Coles – trumpet
- John Coltrane – tenor saxophone
- Chick Corea – keyboard, piano
- Jason Dale – assistant engineering
- Miles Davis – composing, producing, trumpet
- Didier C. Deutsch – A&R
- Charley Drayton – double bass, production, programming
- Bill Evans – piano
- Gil Evans – arranging, conducting
- Azize Faye – African drums
- Al Foster – drums
- Jim Gaines – engineering
- Red Garland – piano
- Bernie Glow – trumpet
- Herbie Hancock – piano
- Bernie Hanighen – composer
- Dick Hixon – trombone
- Jeremy Holiday – A&R
- Dave Holland – bass
- Johnny Hoyt – engineering, remixing
- Don Hunstein – photography
- Robert Irving III – keyboards, producing
- Darryl Jones – electric bass
- Philly Joe Jones – drums
- Oren Karpovsky – assistant engineering
- Frank Laico – engineering
- Cal Lampely – producing
- Teo Macero – audio production, production
- Ndongo Mbaye – talking drum
- John McLaughlin – classic guitar
- Pierre Michelot – bass
- Thelonious Monk – composer
- Louis Mucci – trumpet
- June Murakawa – mixing assistant
- Romeo Penque – clarinet, flute, alto flute
- Fred Plaut – engineering
- Frank Rehak – trombone
- Jerome Richardson – clarinet, flute, alto flute
- Marcel Romano – producing
- Seth Rothstein – project director
- Ernie Royal – trumpet
- Willie Ruff – French horn
- Carlos Santana – guitar
- Eddy Schreyer – mastering
- Gunther Schuller – French horn
- John Scofield – guitar
- Wayne Shorter – tenor saxophone
- Vernon Smith – photography
- Tom Swift – engineering
- Steve Thornton – percussion
- Pat Thrall – guitar, mixing, producing, programming, remixing
- Stan Tonkel – engineering
- Irving Townsend – producer
- René Urtreger – piano
- Ned Washington – composer
- Julius Watkins – French horn
- Mark Wilder – digital remastering
- Barney Wilen – tenor saxophone
- Cootie Williams – composer
- Tony Williams – drums
- Tony Ruption Williams – drums
- Victor Young – composer
- Joe Zawinul – keyboards, piano
- Joel Zimmerman – cover design

== Charting and reviews ==
=== Reviews ===
Professional ratings
Review scores
Source	Rating
Allmusic	Allmusic link

=== Charting history ===
Chart	Peak chart position
Australian Albums (ARIA Charts)	74
Billboard Top Jazz Albums	8
French Albums Chart	89
New Zealand Albums Chart	17

== Certifications ==
Region	Certification	Certified units/sales
Poland (ZPAV)	Gold	10,000^{*}
^{*} Sales figures based on certification alone.
