= Love Child (band) =

- Origin: New York City
- Genres: Alternative rock Punk rock
- Years active: 1987–1990s, 2024
- Labels: Forced Exposure; Homestead; Trash Flow
- Members: Alan Licht; Brendan O'Malley; Rebecca Odes
- Past members: Will Baum

Love Child was a New York City-based alternative rock band whose music combined elements of punk rock and no wave. According to Trouser Press's David Sprague, Love Child was "...one of Gotham's most mercurial bands, able to leap from twee pop tunes to galvanizing skronkadelic constructs in a single bound."

== History ==
Love Child was formed in 1987 by Will Baum, the band's drummer, guitarist, and vocalist, and Rebecca Odes, the band's bassist and vocalist. Alan Licht later joined the band as another guitarist, drummer, and vocalist. When the band was formed, Licht, Odes, and Baum were all students in the class of 1990 at Vassar College. In February 1990, Love Child recorded their debut studio album, Okay?. Later that year, the zine Forced Exposure released Love Child's EP Love Child Plays Moondog. This EP, to which Baum did not contribute, featured four of the band's covers of Moondog songs. Baum left Love Child between the recording of Okay? in 1990 and its release the following year. His role as drummer was subsequently filled by Brendan O'Malley. Okay? was released on Homestead Records in late 1991. The band released its second and final studio album, Witchcraft, in 1992; they broke up soon afterward.

== Critical reception ==
Robert Christgau awarded Okay? a B+ grade, writing, "Too bad these punk-going-no-wave neotraditionalists didn't study their Ramones harder--instead of crowding 21 songs into 45 minutes, they might have grouped the 14 snappiest into a dandy 27-minute shot in the dark." AllMusic's Dan Warburton gave the album three out of five stars, writing, "Licht reveals throughout the album not only an encyclopedic knowledge of the history of the electric guitar, with echoes of Pete Townshend, Robert Quine, Bob Mould, and Rudolph Grey (his solo on "Slow Me Down" is outstanding), but also a genuine talent for songwriting."

Nils Bernstein gave Witchcraft a favorable review in Spin, praising Rebecca Odes as having "one of those casually classic voices such as Kim Deal's, immediately familiar and utterly inimitable." Jason Cherkis of the Daily Collegian also reviewed the album favorably, writing, "On Witchcraft, the group doesn't twist but glides, forming perfect underground nursery rhymes without putting you to sleep." Jason Ankeny of AllMusic gave the album four out of five stars, describing it as "Another wonderful record from one of the most criminally overlooked bands of the early '90s."

== Discography ==
=== LPs ===
- Okay? (Homestead, 1991)
- Witchcraft (Homestead, 1992)
- Never Meant to Be: 1988-1993 (12XU, 2024)

=== EPs ===
- Love Child (Trash Flow, 1990)
- Love Child Plays Moondog (Forced Exposure, 1990)
- Peel Session (12XU, 2024)
