= Dolls Kill =

American online fashion retailer

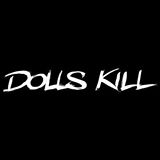
- Type: Private
- Industry: Retail, apparel, e-commerce
- Founded: 2011
- Founder: Shoddy Lynn; Bobby Farahi
- Headquarters: San Francisco, California, United States
- Area served: Worldwide
- Key people: Bobby Farahi; (CEO & co-founder); Shoddy Lynn; (CCO & co-founder)
- Products: Clothing, accessories, decor
- Services: Online retail
- Website: www.dollskill.com

Dolls Kill is an American online fashion brand. The company was named the "Fastest Growing Retailer" in 2014 by Inc. magazine, which also included Dolls Kill as one of the "top companies in San Francisco". Dolls Kill operates a retail website that sells clothing, shoes and accessories and features six collections showcased by "Dolls", models that embody character personas for each collection's style. Dolls Kill is known for featuring kawaii, punk, goth, streetwear and festival fashions. Since 2018 it has also licensed and operated the 1990s brand Delia's as a sub-label.

== History ==
Dolls Kill was co-founded in 2011 by Shoddy Lynn, a former DJ who went by the stage name Shoddy Lynn, and Bobby Farahi. Previously, Farahi was the founder and CEO of Multivision Inc., a broadcast monitoring service that was sold to Bacons Information in 2005. After Farahi sold his first company, the couple started Dolls Kill and it has reportedly been profitable since its launch. Lynn originally entered the e-commerce business by selling clothing on eBay. Later, Dolls Kill was launched as an online marketplace for eccentric accessories such as colorful fox tails before expanding its business to a full clothing and accessories online store. The idea for the company stemmed from Lynn's experiences as a DJ while traveling to music festivals on tour.

In 2014, Dolls Kill secured $5 million in a Series A round of funding from Maveron, a Seattle-based venture capital firm who has also invested in companies such as Shutterfly, eBay, zulily and Pinkberry. After the funding round, Betsy McLaughlin, former CEO of Hot Topic, joined the company's board of directors. Dolls Kill was the fastest growing private company in the San Francisco Bay Area based on revenue percent growth in 2014.

In the summer of 2017 Dolls Kill opened its first pop-up shop in San Francisco's Haight-Ashbury.

In 2018, the brand licensed and re-launched the Delia's brand with a 1990s-throwback theme. In December of that year the brand raised $18 million in a funding round.

== Controversy ==
In 2020, Lynn shared a photo of a line of police officers in front of a Dolls Kill store in Los Angeles with the caption "Direct Action in its glory", along with the Black Lives Matter hashtag, on her Instagram page. This prompted backlash from some internet users, including celebrities SZA and Rico Nasty, and calls for a boycott of Dolls Kill. In a recorded video Lynn explained that the caption of her post "Direct Action" was meant to show solidarity for the movement. The company also pledged $1 million to purchase products from black-owned fashion brands and designers for their site.

Dolls Kill has also been accused of stealing designs from small creators. In 2016, Dolls Kill listed an item that featured a design that was identical to one made by independent designer Nicole Orchard.

== Marketing methods ==
Dolls Kill is an e-commerce apparel website that uses social media marketing to promote its brand and clothing. Similar to companies such as Hot Topic, Spencer Gifts, Nasty Gal, Wanelo, or ModCloth, Dolls Kill operates various accounts on social media platforms showcasing its products and collections. The company also uses social media to turn customers into brand ambassadors. When users share images of themselves on platforms such as Instagram wearing the site's apparel, Dolls Kill will in turn feature the photo on the site with links to the product's purchase page.

Dolls Kill offers clothing products, such as tops, bottoms, dresses, swimwear, outerwear, and lingerie. The company also provides accessories, including bags and belts, beauty, hats and jewelry. In addition, it offers shoes, tights, and socks. Registration is not required to shop on the Dolls Kill website, but users can create accounts to save billing and shipping information. The site is shut down for six hours before Black Friday.

Dolls Kill features six collections represented by characters known as "Dolls." Each Doll is a model that embodies the style of the collection's theme:

- Coco, the feminine and girly collection referred to as "frilly Kawaii"
- Mercy, the dark, mysterious goth collection or haute Goth
- Willow, the laid-back, vintage collection for festival fashion
- Darby, the punk-rock, alternative collection
- Kandi, the Electronic Dance Music (EDM), raver collection that lives a lifestyle of PLUR.
- Mia, the collection that stays on top of online clothing trends.
