= GoFish =

Website

GoFish Corporation
- Founded: San Francisco, California, United States (2003)
- Defunct: 2009
- Parent: Betawave
- Website: gofish.com

GoFish was a San Francisco-based online video sharing website founded in 2003 by Michael Downing. It was founded as a search engine for digital music, audio books, ringtones and other media online, and operated as GoFish until 2009 then the service became the advertising network BetaWave in 2009 after a failed attempt at changing their niche into children's media. In 2010, BetaWave had also shutdown after "running out of money".

GoFish was an important step in content distribution, as it was one of the first mainstream video sharing websites. In 2005, YouTube and Google Video launched, which may have taken some of GoFish's audience. Towards the end of its service, the site had close to 20 million users.

GoFish used Java with the Apache Tomcat web server to drive their website, and used either PostgreSQL or Oracle as their backend database.

== History ==
In 2003, GoFish was founded, and went public on the OTC Bulletin Board In February 2007, GoFish Corporation attempted a merger with Bolt.com, but later dropped the deal as their stock plummeted.

At one point in mid 2007, GoFish was the home to web television such as MMA Today (), which offered highlights from various Mixed Martial Arts events as well as Hidden Celebrity Cams. The shows were known as "Made For Internet".

In January 2008, the service received funding (US$22.5 million) to begin transitioning towards family/children's media, with its site now showing "Delivering Kids, Teens, and Moms" on the front page of their website. The site had begun a publishing partnership with the children's game website Miniclip, and WeeWorld. The service had also expanded its offices into New York City, and Chicago. GoFish had begun to phase out its video service, re-fashioning into an advertising network targeting children.

In early 2009, GoFish.com began redirecting to a page on GoFishCorp stating that it had become Betawave

Since the end of 2014, it displays a big fish like symbol: "<><".
