= Maybe You Should Talk to Someone =

2019 memoir by Lori Gottlieb

Maybe You Should Talk to Someone: A Therapist, Her Therapist, and Our Lives Revealed
- Author: Lori Gottlieb
- Language: English
- Genre: Nonfiction; Autobiography (Memoir)
- Published: April 2, 2019 (Houghton Mifflin Harcourt)
- Publication place: United States
- Media type: Print (hardcover)
- Pages: 432
- ISBN: 9781328662057

Maybe You Should Talk to Someone: A Therapist, Her Therapist, and Our Lives Revealed is a book by Lori Gottlieb, published in 2019. It is a memoir where Gottlieb portrays a difficult time in her professional and personal life. The dual nature of the book enables Gottlieb to show her world as both a therapist and someone receiving therapy. Gottlieb explores five patients, including herself, and their different scenarios and viewpoints on life.

== Synopsis ==
Lori Gottlieb, psychotherapist, was in a long time relationship when suddenly it all came crashing down. Her boyfriend decides to break up with her because he can not live with a kid. This was a surprise to Gottlieb as the couple were deciding to get married and her boyfriend knew she had a child. During this time in her life, Gottlieb depicts common human emotions and struggles as anyone who is encountering hardships. Despite being an expert and trained therapist herself, Gottlieb was encouraged by her friends to see a therapist due to her negative state of mind. She realizes that her grief can be addressed with a therapist and so she begins to see one named Wendell. In her first few sessions, Lori sits with her grief and cries. Once she has moved on from this stage, Wendell states that he thinks she is suffering with something more complicated than losing a boyfriend. This takes Gottlieb by surprise and confusion as she only came for a couple of sessions.

As the sessions continue, Lori takes us back to the beginning of her career. Lori is a writer in Los Angeles and works on a medical drama which sparked her interest in medical school. In order to fulfill her desire to help others and continue story telling, she decides to become a therapist.

As the book progresses, Gottlieb talks about her four patients. John is a successful producer who is around the age of forty. He has two kids and is married. He believes that everyone around him is an idiot and that they are the problem. He doesn't sleep a lot and is also having issues with his wife. At the beginning of the sessions, he is not likable and insults his therapist. Gottlieb tries to find a way to connect and see the underlying issue. She later finds out that he lost his son and experienced trauma that impacts his behavior and emotions. A young woman named Julie is a newly wed and goes on her honeymoon. When she returns, she thinks she is pregnant as she feels something in her breast. But this was cancer which she was able to treat. Six months later, Julie goes to her sign off scan hoping that all is well and she can get pregnant now. However, she developed a rare form of cancer that is untreatable. The book shows how Julie struggles with her situation and with society's thoughts. Rita is a woman who is turning seventy and is very depressed. At a young age, Rita dropped out of college and married someone. After a couple of years, the husband had a drinking problem and became abusive to the children. Rita made significant mistakes as a parent and her adult children would not talk to her. She was not able to obtain her career of choice, had failed marriages, and was alone and isolated. Rita explains that joy is unanticipated pain and not pleasure for her. She seeks forgiveness from her children. She also tells Gottlieb that she does not want to live anymore if life doesn't get better. Charlotte is a woman in her twenties and is successful with her job. She drinks too much and ends up with the wrong man every time she hooks up, including someone in the waiting room. She gave up the hope of having a good childhood to have a better adulthood.

== Characters ==
- Lori Gottlieb is a therapist and a patient
- John is a self-absorbed Hollywood producer
- Julie is a newlywed around the age of thirty, diagnosed with a terminal illness
- Rita is a senior citizen who wants to end her life on her birthday
- Charlotte is a twenty-seven-year-old woman struggling with damaging relationships and alcoholism
- Wendell is Lori Gottlieb's psychotherapist

== Reception ==
The book was on The New York Times best-seller list for Hardcover Nonfiction. A review in The New York Times praised the book's effective storytelling, which turns its anecdotes into "a kind of ensemble soap opera." The reviewer also said of the writing style that "Gottlieb can be judgmental and obsessive, but she’s authentic, even raw, about herself and her patients." It received a starred review in Kirkus Reviews, and was also reviewed by Publishers Weekly, USA Today, Time, New Statesman, and Slate.

== Adaptation ==
ABC Studios was previously developing a television series based on the book with Eva Longoria.
