= Steven Berkowitz =

American business magnate

- Born: Steven H Berkowitz; September 4, 1958 (age 68)
- Education: University at Albany, SUNY
- Occupation: Former CEO of Lumosity
- Website: Steve Berkowitz

Steven Berkowitz (born September 4, 1958) is the former CEO of Lumosity and of Move, Inc. After nearly a year on the board of directors of Move, Inc, Berkowitz was selected to succeed Michael Long as the CEO. After completing the acquisition of Move by Newscorp, his tenure ended in January 2015.

== Education ==
He has a bachelor's degree in accounting from the University at Albany, SUNY. His former house at 2795 Evergreen Point Road in Medina, Washington, US was featured in a residential architecture magazine as well as 425 Magazine.

== Career ==
Prior to joining Move, he was Senior Vice President of the Online Services Group at Microsoft Corporation (NASDAQ:MSFT). There, Berkowitz was responsible for running the Online Business group, which includes MSN.com, MSN TV and MSN Internet Access programming, advertising sales, business development, and marketing for Live Platform, MSN and Windows Live.

Before joining Microsoft in May 2006, Berkowitz was chief executive officer of Ask Jeeves, an online search engine, from January 2004 until August 2005, when the business was sold to IAC/InterActiveCorp (NASDAQ:IACI). After its acquisition by IAC/InterActiveCorp., Ask Jeeves was renamed IAC Search and Media, and Berkowitz was its chief executive officer until May 2006. Berkowitz was president of the Web Properties Division of Ask Jeeves from May 2001 until December 2003.

=== Lumosity ===
CEO (November 2, 2015 to March 2019) Lumos Labs is the maker of Lumosity, an online program and mobile application consisting of games , challenging you in the areas of memory, attention, flexibility, speed of processing, and problem solving.

=== Bazzarvoice ===
Board Member (October 2015 to current)

=== Move, Inc. ===
CEO (January 21, 2009 to January 5, 2015) Board Member (June 2008 to January 5, 2015)

=== The Ladders ===
Board Member (July, 2008 to September 2013)

=== Microsoft ===
Senior Vice President, Online Services Group (May, 2006 to September 2008)
