= Delia's =

American lifestyle brand

Delia's, Inc.
- Type: Private
- Industry: E-commerce
- Founded: 1993 (33 years ago) in New York City, New York, United States
- Defunct: 2015, as a retailer
- Headquarters: New York City, New York, United States
- Key people: Tracy Gardner (CEO); Brian Lattman (President); Patricia Johnson (Chief Merchandising Officer)
- Products: Young women and girl's apparel & accessories
- Owner: Steve Russo

Delia's, Inc. (stylized as dELiA*s) was a lifestyle brand of apparel and accessories, primarily targeting girls and young women.

From its founding in 1993 until its closure in 2015, Delia's was an independent retailer and direct marketer, and in its prime was the leading marketer to 10 to 24-year-old females in the United States, with labels for preteen girls (#deliasgirls) 7-13 and girls between the ages of 13 and 19. Delia's was popular among college women, as many of its products were affordable and suitable for college-age students. It currently operates under license as a sub-brand of online retailer Dolls Kill.

== Products ==
Delia's sells apparel (including pants, shorts, skirts, tees, jackets, blazers, and bikini tops and bottoms), accessories, footwear (including shoes and boots), cosmetics, and room furnishings. The brand previously sold to teenage consumers through direct mail catalogs, websites, and, for Delia's, mall-based specialty retail stores. As of 2020, Delia's products are only for sale through its parent label, Dolls Kill.

== History ==
The company was launched in 1993 by two Yale University graduates. One company focus was its Gen Y understanding, as reflected in its use of the internet for furthering brand identity.

The company was acquired by Alloy Inc. in 2003, for $50 million. The combined company had annual catalog, internet, and retail sales of $300 million. It also had a database of over 20 million names, constituting 30%–40% of U.S. consumers who were 12–18 years old. Alloy then spun off the company in 2005.

In January 2013 HRSH Acquisitions LLC bought Alloy Inc, now being marketed as Alloy Apparel, for $3.7 million in cash. HRSH also assumed $3.1 million in liabilities. On December 5, 2014, it announced that it had filed for Chapter 11 bankruptcy protection in the United States Bankruptcy Court for the Southern District of New York, and would be liquidating all 95 stores. Shortly after, its shares fell more than 80% to $0.02. Steve Russo of Fab/Starpoint acquired the brand for $2.5 million, and in August 2015, re-opened the store with an online-only presence, but this was unsuccessful.

Online fashion company Dolls Kill later licensed the Delia's name and re-launched it as a sub-brand in November 2018, with its clothes available online and through pop-ups in Los Angeles and San Francisco.

== Subsidiaries ==
In December 1997, Delia's acquired Gurl.com. It later sponsored a free e-mail and web hosting service, known as Gurlmail and Gurlpages respectively, owned by Lycos. Beginning in May 1998, Gurl.com began to offer merchandise from Delia's catalogue.

In 1999, Delia's opened iTurf as an online subsidiary, including Gurl.com and its associated web addresses as properties under iTurf, in an attempt to build teen-centered websites marketed towards Generation Y. During its initial public offering in 1999, shares were priced up to $66 each. iTurf's websites had 35 million page views in February 1999 and $2.1 million in sales for the quarter ending on January 31, 1999. In the same fiscal year, they had earnings of $425,000 on sales of $4 million.

After the dot-com bubble burst, in the first six months of 2000, iTurf reported nearly $16 million in losses. Delia's sold or closed all its Internet properties with the exception of Gurl.com, which was sold to Primedia (now Rent Group) in May 2001 for an undisclosed amount.
