= CherryPicks =

American review aggregator for film and television

- Website type: Film and television review aggregator
- Creators: Miranda Bailey; Rebecca Odes
- Website: thecherrypicks.com
- Launched: 2018

The CherryPicks is a review-aggregation website site for film and television that was founded in 2018 by Miranda Bailey and Rebecca Odes. The site includes female and non-binary critics, excluding the opinions of male critics to offer a different perspective from sites like Rotten Tomatoes.

== History ==
Miranda Bailey, who produced the films The Diary of a Teenage Girl and Swiss Army Man, and Rebecca Odes founded the site in 2018, which was announced at South by Southwest. It was inspired by the male perspective in film being dominant over its equal number of female critics. Unlike Rotten Tomatoes' option of Fresh or Rotten approval rating, the CherryPicks uses a four level rating system including bowl of cherries, two cherries, one cherry, and the pits.
