= Harris myCFO =

Banking business unit

- Industry: finance
- Founder: James H. Clark
- Headquarters: Chicago IL
- Key people: Joe Calabrese (president)
- Services: investment advisory tax planning financial reporting expense management estate planning trust services risk management & insurance advisory philanthropic planning family education capital advisory and custom banking
- Website: www.harrismycfo.com

Harris myCFO is the American wealth management unit of BMO Harris Bank serving high-net-worth individuals and families. In 2002, Harris acquired certain assets of myCFO, Inc., founded by James H. Clark, in a $30 million deal. Harris myCFO provides a variety of services including investment advisory and family office services. Harris myCFO managed over $18 billion in assets in 2011 and Forbes ranked the company seventh on a list of top fee-only investment advisors.

== Services ==
=== Harris myCFO ===
Harris myCFO is a brand used by Harris myCFO Inc. offering integrated wealth management with independent investment advisory services and the comprehensive capabilities of a multi-family office. These services include investment advisory, tax planning, financial reporting and expense management, estate planning and trust services, risk management and insurance advisory, philanthropic planning, family education, capital advisory, and custom banking.

The president of Harris myCFO is Joe Calabrese, who has led the company since 2002.

=== Harris myCFO Investment Advisory Services LLC ===
Harris myCFO Investment Advisory Services LLC, is a Securities and Exchange Commission-registered investment advisor and certain divisions of Harris N.A. are national banks with trust powers. Harris myCFO Investment Advisory Services, LLC works with affluent clients by integrating their investment planning and financial services.

Craig Rawlins is the president of Harris myCFO Investment Advisory Services LLC. Harris announced the hiring of Rawlins in December 2009; he previously worked as director of client services at Russell Investment Group and held positions at Ernst & Young and Gresham Partners.

=== Harris myCFO, Inc. ===
Harris myCFO, Inc. provides family office services. Family office services include financial planning and coordination, wealth transfer planning, tax planning, risk management and insurance, philanthropic planning, expense management, bill payment, family education, estate and trust services, liquidity strategies, and comprehensive financial reporting.

John Benevides is a president of Harris myCFO Inc. overseeing Family Office Services for the company. Benevides' appointment was announced in October 2010; prior to his appointment at Harris myCFO, he was co-owner and President of Family Office Exchange (FOX).

== Recognition ==
- Ranked 7th on Forbes, "Top 50 Financial Advisors" list (2011)
- Ranked 9th on Bloomberg Markets’ "Top 50 Family Offices" list (2011)
- Ranked 3rd on Forbes "Top 50 Fee-Only Advisers" list (2008)

== Locations ==
- Palo Alto, California
- Chicago, Illinois
- Seattle, Washington
- New York, New York
- San Francisco, California
- Los Angeles, California

== Criticism ==
In 2002, myCFO was implicated in a federal investigation involving questionable tax shelters. In July 2005, the American Arbitration Association ruled against myCFO and its partners for its involvement. On February 13, 2008, a federal trial court delivered a criminal conviction on Graham Taylor, a tax attorney associated with myCFO; Taylor had pleaded guilty on January 24, 2008, to conspiracy and aiding in the filing of a false tax return. Taylor used to be with the LeBoeuf law firm, which was used by myCFO selling tax shelter products. The tax accountants and attorneys, including Taylor, convicted in 2008, had been indicted in November 2005 for conspiring to defraud the United States and to commit mail and wire fraud, including tax evasion and assisting in the filing of false tax returns.

== See also ==
- Bank of Montreal
- Peter Solvik
