= Peter Solvik =

Peter Solvik is an American venture capitalist in technology companies. He was formerly a chief information officer at Cisco Systems, Inc.

== Education ==
Solvik got his undergraduate degree in 1980 from the University of Illinois Urbana-Champaign, the school's first graduate with a dual degree in business and computer science.

== Career ==
=== Information technology ===
After graduating, Solvik joined Texas Instruments, and moved to Apple as the personal computing sector took off, where he ran its AppleLink group. After 11 years at Apple, he served as Senior Vice President and CIO of Cisco Systems, Inc. from 1993 until 2002. While at Cisco, Solvik was an executive sponsor of internal initiatives such as the creation of Status Agent, which allowed customers to track the status of their own orders online. He was instrumental in Cisco's acquisition of over 100 companies, including Calico Technology.

In August 2000, BusinessWeek recognized Solvik as a "standout" CIO for his leadership of Cisco's e-sales and supply chain management initiatives, which had resulted in a reduction of $1.5 billion in costs by using Internet technologies across a wide range of areas, including human resources and manufacturing. In December 2000, Network World named him one of its "25 most powerful people in networking". That same year, B to B magazine named him one of its "Top 25 E-Champions".

=== Venture capital ===
Solvik is co-founder and Managing Director of Jackson Square Ventures (fka Sigma West), a venture capital firm focused on B2B SaaS and Marketplaces. Previously, he was a Managing Director at Sigma Partners, which he joined in 2002. Prior to Sigma, he also served on the Board of Directors of myCFO.

Solvik's successful investments include DocuSign; his fund's $17.5 million investment in that company was valued at $687 million when the company when public in 2018.
