= Dan Pelson =

American media and experiential-entertainment executive

- Born: 1966 (age 59–60); Ann Arbor, Michigan, U.S.
- Education: Colgate University (B.A.); NYU Stern School of Business (M.B.A.)
- Occupations: Media and entertainment executive
- Known for: Co-founding Word Magazine, Concrete Media, Bolt.com, uPlayMe; COO of AREA15

Dan Pelson (born 1966) is an American media and experiential-entertainment executive best known for co-founding a string of early internet ventures, including Word Magazine, Concrete Media, Bolt.com and the social-music network uPlayMe, and for later leading the immersive-retail complex AREA15 in Las Vegas as its chief operating officer.

== Early life and education ==
Pelson was born in 1966 in Ann Arbor, Michigan. He earned a Bachelor of Arts in political science and economics from Colgate University and a Master of Business Administration in international marketing from New York University Stern School of Business.

== Career ==
Pelson began his career in 1988 at Sun Microsystems, holding marketing, sales and product-development roles focused on media-industry clients. In June 1995, Pelson joined writer Carey Earle and designer Tom Livaccari to launch Word Magazine, one of the web's first ad-supported multimedia webzines. Seeing commercial potential in the nascent Internet, he and partners spun the editorial startup into Concrete Media in 1996.

Under Concrete's umbrella, Pelson and illustrator Jane Mount launched Bolt.com in September 1996, an early social-network community for teens that by 1999 hosted three million registered users and 50,000 user-run clubs. Pelson served as chairman and chief executive of both Concrete Media and Bolt during the first dot-com boom.

In 2006, Pelson re-entered the music sector, co-founding uPlayMe, a desktop application that matched listeners in real time; Wired dubbed it an effort to make "music social again" without costly label licences. In the same year, Warner Music Group appointed him senior vice-president for global consumer marketing, where he built direct-to-fan businesses across the label group; he left in mid-2008 to return as uPlayMe's chief executive. He is also a co-founder of SunPress Vinyl, a record pressing plant.

From 2009 to 2016, Pelson worked for Sony Music Entertainment and Sony Corporation of America. At Sony Music, he oversaw the Direct to Consumer global operations and was the CEO of MyPlay, Sony's music video platform from 2008 to 2013. He also served as an executive producer of The X Factor Digital Experience.

In March 2019, Pelson became chief operating officer of AREA15, a 200,000 sq ft immersive retail and entertainment district west of the Las Vegas Strip. Pelson oversaw operations, leasing and events as AREA15 welcomed nearly four million visitors in its first three years. He resigned in November 2024 amid a restructuring that sought a Las Vegas-based COO; the company cited Pelson's preference to remain in New York with his family.

Since 2020, Pelson has been a director and, from 2023, nominating-committee chair, of Urban Art (formerly Urban Arts Partnership), a New York nonprofit delivering technology-and-arts programmes in under-resourced public schools. He has also served on the board of Teach For America.

== Personal life ==
Pelson is based in New York City. He is married to Jenny Kwong and has three children.
