= Rachel Nabors =

American cartoonist

- Born: March 9, 1985 (age 41) Harrisburg, Pennsylvania, U.S.
- Awards: Kimberly Yale Award for Best New Talent

Rachel Nabors (born March 9, 1985) is an American cartoonist, artist, and graphic novelist, best known for their serialized comic, Rachel the Great, as well as their two graphic novels, 18 Revolutions and Crow Princess.

== Early life ==
Nabors was born in Harrisburg, Pennsylvania in 1985. They left public school in the fifth grade to be homeschooled, and began drawing comics seriously at age fourteen. They started as a professional cartoonist at age seventeen when they began to receive a steady income from drawing comics.

== Career ==
Soon after their nineteenth birthday, Nabors self-published 18 Revolutions. This was soon followed by Crow Princess. They also have self-published several mini-comics including A Brief History of Grifonton and Subculture of One: the Body Issues.

They made comics for Gurl.com on a weekly basis until March 2008, when they took a comics hiatus while they straightened out an important jaw surgery and got married. In summer 2010 they had said surgery with the assistance and support of their fans. However, they were unable financially to return to making comics and continued their career in web development instead.

They also ran a banner exchange for comics by, for and about women at exchange.rubifruit.com as well as the manga review and news site MangaPunk.com.

Currently they reside in London, England working for Facebook on the React Core Team and travel the world teaching web animations at web development conferences.

== Awards ==
The Friends of Lulu honored Nabors with the 2007 Kimberly Yale Award for Best New Talent.
