= Healtheon =

Former American healthcare technology company

Healtheon Corporation
- Founded: 1996; 30 years ago
- Founder: James H. Clark; Pavan Nigam
- Defunct: 1999; 27 years ago
- Fate: Acquired by WebMD
- Headquarters: Santa Clara, California, United States

Healtheon was an American dot-com company founded by James H. Clark and Pavan Nigam. The company's mission was to "use the power of computing and the Internet to revolutionize the healthcare industry, stripping away its inefficiencies and inequities and streamlining it for the new millennium."

In 1999, the company was acquired by WebMD.

== History ==
In mid-1995, James H. Clark, the founder of Netscape, came up with the idea to modernize technology in the health care industry. He founded Healthscape in early 1996 with funding from Kleiner Perkins Caufield & Byers. To avoid confusion with Netscape, the company changed its name to Healtheon.

The company's first big idea was to develop a system for linking insurers and human resources departments. However, the idea failed since insurers dismissed it as too expensive and human resource departments were not interested.

In 1997, Mike Long became chief executive officer of the company. Five months later, the company formed a research and development partnership with Brown & Toland, a network of 1,600 physicians in San Francisco.

in February 1998, the company announced the acquisition of ActaMed, a medical-records clearinghouse for doctors and insurers, for $150 million, which gave the company a source of revenue.

In August 1998, the company filed for an initial public offering, but the offering was cancelled in October 1998, after stock prices dropped due to the 1998 Russian financial crisis.

In February 1999, the company completed its IPO and became a public company and the stock price rose 400% on its first day of trading.

On April 21, 1999, the company announced the acquisition of MedE America for $478 million in stock.

On May 20, 1999, the company announced a merger with WebMD.
