= Literary Kicks =

- Website type: Literary
- Founded: 1994
- Founder: Levi Asher
- Website: litkicks.com

Literary Kicks is a website that is a digital library of poetry and prose, biography and cultural criticism chiefly focused on Beat Generation writers. The site was founded in 1994 by Levi Asher. It has since expanded to cover a wider range of literary genres, from ancient literature to contemporary fiction and poetry. It hosts literary discussions, poetry boards, workshops, and a digital library of articles, resources, and texts.
