= Lori Gottlieb =

21st century American writer and psychotherapist

- Born: December 1966 (age 59); Los Angeles, California, United States
- Education: Stanford University (BA); Pepperdine University (MA)
- Occupations: Writer, psychotherapist
- Employer(s): The Atlantic; National Public Radio
- Known for: Maybe You Should Talk to Someone; Marry Him: The Case for Settling for Mr. Good Enough; “Dear Therapist” column in The Atlantic
- Notable work: Maybe You Should Talk to Someone; Marry Him: The Case for Settling for Mr. Good Enough

Lori Gottlieb (December 1966, Los Angeles, California, USA) is an American writer and psychotherapist. She is the author of the New York Times bestsellers, Maybe You Should Talk to Someone and Marry Him: The Case for Settling for Mr. Good Enough. She also writes the weekly “Dear Therapist” advice column for The Atlantic and is the co-host of the iHeart Radio podcast "Dear Therapists." Her TED Talk was one of the most-watched talks of 2019.

== Life and career ==
Gottlieb was born in Los Angeles in 1966. She obtained her undergraduate degree from Stanford University in 1989, where she was a member of Kappa Kappa Gamma. She obtained a Masters of Clinical Psychology at Pepperdine University in 2010. She is a licensed Marriage and Family Therapist.

Gottlieb was a commentator for National Public Radio and a contributing editor for The Atlantic. She told the story of how she had her son at The Moth mainstage show in Aspen, Colorado.

Her memoir/self-help book Maybe You Should Talk to Someone was being developed and adapted for television by Eva Longoria for ABC Network.
