= 2001 Webby Awards =

US internet awards ceremony

The 2001 Webby Awards were held in San Francisco at the War Memorial Opera House on July 18, 2001, hosted by Alan Cumming. The Lifetime Achievement Award, which debuted this year, went to Ray Tomlinson and Douglas Engelbart. It was the first awards held after the dot-com crash; as a result, they were smaller and quieter than in years past. The organization hired agency Diesel Design to create three ancillary sites to their main one for the 2001 ceremony, one site dedicated to award nominees, an RSVP site for guests, and a site for the winners. The agency also created print and online ads for the awards show, as well as interior signage, posters, and invitations.

== Nominees and winners ==
(http://www.webbyawards.com/winners/2001)

Winners and nominees are generally named according to the organization or website winning the award, although the recipient is, technically, the web design firm or internal department that created the winning site and in the case of corporate websites, the designer's client. Web links are provided for informational purposes, both in the most recently available archive.org version before the awards ceremony and, where available, the current website. Many older websites no longer exist, are redirected, or have been substantially redesigned.

Category	Winner	People's Voice winner	Other nominees
Activism	VolunteerMatch (Archived 21 July 2001 via Wayback)	act for change (Archived 22 July 2001 via Wayback)	Independent Media Center (Archived 23 August 2001 via Wayback)
Activism	VolunteerMatch (Archived 21 July 2001 via Wayback)	act for change (Archived 22 July 2001 via Wayback)	PETA (Archived 12 July 2001 via Wayback)
Activism	VolunteerMatch (Archived 21 July 2001 via Wayback)	act for change (Archived 22 July 2001 via Wayback)	Protest Net (Archived 22 July 2001 via Wayback)
Art	YOUNG-HAE CHANG HEAVY INDUSTRIES (Archived 22 July 2001 via Wayback)		1to1 (Archived 1 August 2001 via Wayback)
Art	YOUNG-HAE CHANG HEAVY INDUSTRIES (Archived 22 July 2001 via Wayback)		Apartment (Archived 1 August 2001 via Wayback)
Art	YOUNG-HAE CHANG HEAVY INDUSTRIES (Archived 22 July 2001 via Wayback)		Glasbead (Archived 21 July 2001 via Wayback)
Art	YOUNG-HAE CHANG HEAVY INDUSTRIES (Archived 22 July 2001 via Wayback)		Potatoland (Archived 21 July 2001 via Wayback)
Best Practices	Google (Archived 13 July 2001 via Wayback)		Amazon (Archived 21 July 2001 via Wayback)
Best Practices	Google (Archived 13 July 2001 via Wayback)		Slashdot (Archived 20 July 2001 via Wayback)
Best Practices	Google (Archived 13 July 2001 via Wayback)		Yahoo! (Archived 13 July 2001 via Wayback)
Best Practices	Google (Archived 13 July 2001 via Wayback)		{fray} (Archived 2 July 2001 via Wayback)
Broadband	Heavy (Archived 9 July 2001 via Wayback)	Yahoo!Finance Vision (Archived 20 July 2001 via Wayback)	120 Seconds (Archived 12 July 2001 via Wayback)
Broadband	Heavy (Archived 9 July 2001 via Wayback)	Yahoo!Finance Vision (Archived 20 July 2001 via Wayback)	Once Upon A Forest (Archived 21 July 2001 via Wayback)
Broadband	Heavy (Archived 9 July 2001 via Wayback)	Yahoo!Finance Vision (Archived 20 July 2001 via Wayback)	Pulitzer Newseum - Photos (Archived 13 August 2001 via Wayback)
Commerce	Travelocity (Archived 13 July 2001 via Wayback)	Cafepress.com (Archived 20 July 2001 via Wayback)	GORPtravel.com (Archived 21 July 2001 via Wayback)
Commerce	Travelocity (Archived 13 July 2001 via Wayback)	Cafepress.com (Archived 20 July 2001 via Wayback)	Half.com (Archived 9 October 2001 via Wayback)
Commerce	Travelocity (Archived 13 July 2001 via Wayback)	Cafepress.com (Archived 20 July 2001 via Wayback)	mySimon (Archived 22 July 2001 via Wayback)
Games	3D Groove (Archived 21 July 2001 via Wayback)	IGN (Archived 19 June 2001 via Wayback)	Gamasutra (Archived 17 June 2001 via Wayback)
Games	3D Groove (Archived 21 July 2001 via Wayback)	IGN (Archived 19 June 2001 via Wayback)	GameLab (Archived 17 September 2001 via Wayback)
Games	3D Groove (Archived 21 July 2001 via Wayback)	IGN (Archived 19 June 2001 via Wayback)	MyVideoGames.com (Archived 21 July 2001 via Wayback)
Games	3D Groove (Archived 21 July 2001 via Wayback)	IGN (Archived 19 June 2001 via Wayback)	SiSSYFiGHT (Archived 20 July 2001 via Wayback)
Services	VolunteerMatch	LiveJournal	PayPal
Services	VolunteerMatch	LiveJournal	PlanetFeedback
Services	VolunteerMatch	LiveJournal	ShoutCast
Services	VolunteerMatch	LiveJournal	Vindigo(Archived 17 Sept 2001 via Wayback)
Sports	Swell.com (Archived 8 July 2001 via Wayback)	ESPN.com (Archived 27 September 2001 via Wayback)	bowl.com (Archived 21 July 2001 via Wayback)
Sports	Swell.com (Archived 8 July 2001 via Wayback)	ESPN.com (Archived 27 September 2001 via Wayback)	CBS SportsLine.com (Archived 20 July 2001 via Wayback)
Sports	Swell.com (Archived 8 July 2001 via Wayback)	ESPN.com (Archived 27 September 2001 via Wayback)	Planet Rugby (Archived 21 July 2001 via Wayback)
