= Mike Long (American businessman) =

American businessman and former CEO of several public companies

W. Michael Long
- Born: William Michael Long c. 1953 (age 72–73)
- Other name: Mike Long
- Education: University of North Carolina at Chapel Hill
- Occupation: Business executive
- Years active: 1980s–present
- Known for: Former CEO of Healtheon/WebMD
- Spouse: Betty
- Children: 3

Mike Long is an American business executive and entrepreneur known for leading major technology and healthcare companies including Healtheon/WebMD, Homestore (now Move, Inc.), and Lumeris. He has been recognized for his work integrating technology into healthcare management.

== Early life and education ==
Long earned a Bachelor of Arts degree from the University of North Carolina at Chapel Hill.

== Career ==
=== Continuum ===
Long served as president and chief executive of Continuum, a software and consulting firm specializing in insurance systems, which was later acquired by Computer Sciences Corporation (CSC).

=== Healtheon and WebMD (1997–2001) ===
In 1997, Long became chief executive officer of Healtheon, a healthcare technology company founded by Jim Clark. Under Long’s leadership, Healtheon merged with WebMD and launched an initial public offering (IPO). He later served as chairman of the combined company. During his tenure, Long reoriented the firm from serving insurers toward developing software and services for physicians and healthcare providers.

Long envisioned cutting $300 billion in waste from the healthcare industry, but what he "saw as waste others saw as income." Long's objectives for WebMD would meet significant resistance from the industry, and were never able to match his aspirations. WebMD exists now only as an easily accessible encyclopedia of health-related information.

=== Homestore / Move, Inc. (2002–2003) ===
Long became CEO of Homestore in January 2002, at a time when the company was recovering from accounting controversies and leadership turnover. He implemented restructuring measures and helped stabilize operations before his departure the following year.

=== Lumeris and Essence Group Holdings ===
In 2001 Long became chairman and chief executive officer of Lumeris, a healthcare technology company that supports value-based care models, and of its parent, Essence Group Holdings Corporation (EGHC). Under his leadership, Lumeris has partnered with health systems and payers to manage medical spend and improve care coordination.

=== Sulgrave Partners ===
In late March 2009, along with Taylor Griffin and Jack Dennison, Long launched Sulgrave Partners LLC, a business advisory–consulting firm headquartered in Washington, D.C. He is also chairman of NEOS Geosolutions, a privately held geosciences technology company, and chairman of Essence Group Holdings Corporation (EGHC), a privately held managed care and healthcare information technology business that develops and markets tools and technology supportive of more accountable, patient-centered healthcare.

== In popular culture ==
Long’s role at Healtheon was profiled in Michael Lewis’s 1999 book The New New Thing, which chronicled Silicon Valley entrepreneurs during the internet boom.

== Personal life ==
Long is married to his college sweetheart Betty and has three children. He has been described by Fortune magazine as “soft-spoken and strait-laced.”
