= Digital Music News =

American online music magazine

Digital Music News is an American online magazine covering the music industry. It was founded by Paul Resnikoff. The site has been described by The New York Times as an industry blog.

In 2012, a post on the website by an anonymous user claiming to be a Grooveshark employee, who claimed that Grooveshark committed copyright infringement, was the subject of a subpoena by Grooveshark asking for identifying information about the user.
