= I Done This =

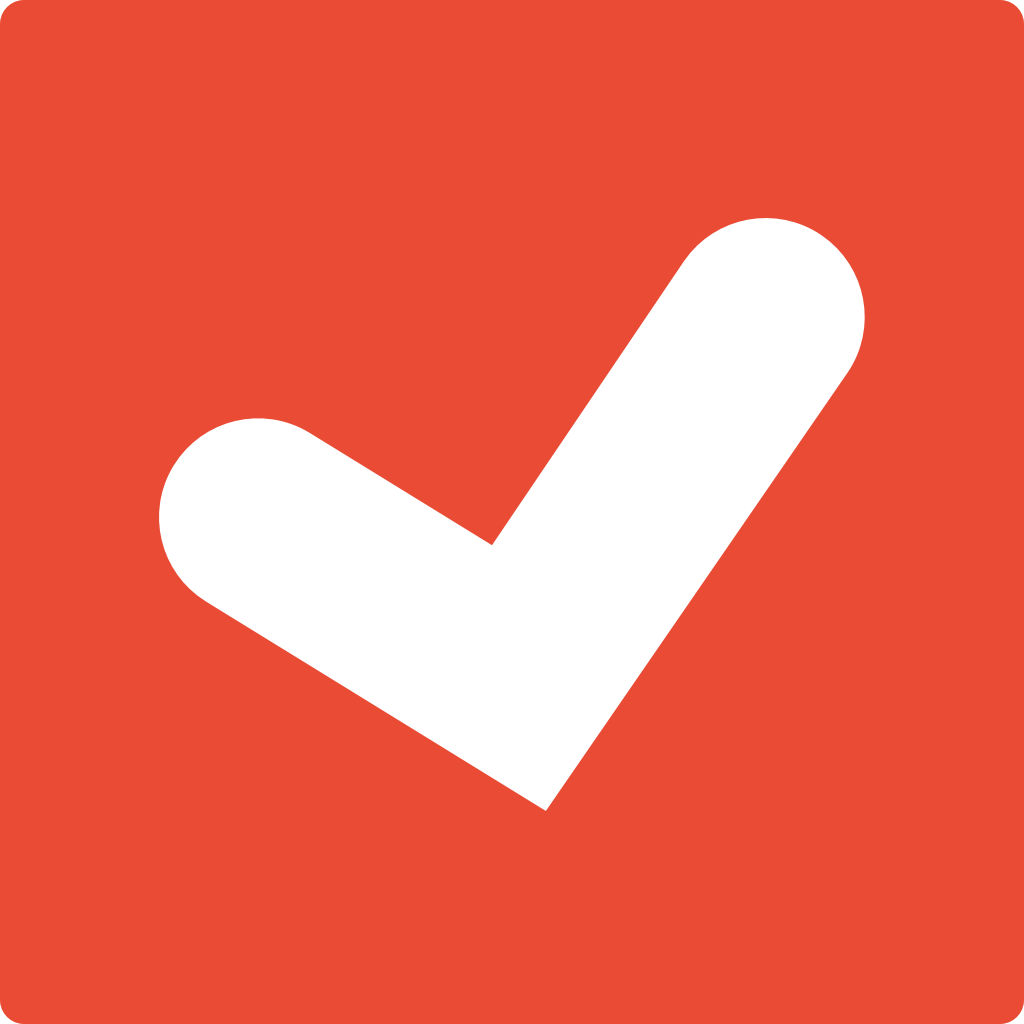
- Company type: Software
- Industry: Productivity software; Software industry
- Founded: 2011 in San Francisco, California, U.S.
- Founders: Walter Chen; Rodrigo Guzman
- Headquarters: San Francisco, California, U.S.
- Area served: Worldwide
- Website: idonethis.com

I Done This is a collaboration tool to track accomplishments and to-do lists. The application is available through the website and through an email-based system. It was founded in 2011 by Walter Chen and Rodrigo Guzman as an AngelPad startup.

In 2011 and 2017, the application received many productivity awards by newspapers such as Business Insider, The Next Web, and Huffington Post mentioned the I Done This app for teams as a way to track personal and collective accomplishments.

== Email ==
The email system works by replying to emails sent by the system. For example, the user will reply to a reminder email asking, "What did you get done today?" The timing and frequency of these emails can be adjusted in the profile.
