= Alt.culture =

Online encyclopedia of youth culture

- Founded: 1996
- Website: www.altculture.com
- Current status: Defunct

alt.culture was an online encyclopedia of youth culture, especially relating to Generation X, in the 1990s, based on the book Alt.Culture: An A-to-Z Guide to the 90's – Underground, Online and Over-the-Counter by Nathaniel Wice and Steven Daly.

The website was described by Chuck Klosterman in The Nineties as "an unknowing precursor to Wikipedia" and provided "countercultural definitions for things that weren't important enough to be defined anywhere else." It had entries "covering everything from Alicia Silverstone to *69," which the book described as "a relationship-altering phone feature, also a 1994 song by R.E.M."

In 1997, Wice and Daly signed an agreement with Pathfinder, Time Warner Inc.'s content portal, which contracted them to write five new entries a week and regularly updating the site.

== See also ==
- List of online encyclopedias
