= Miriam Grossman =

American psychiatrist and activist

Miriam Grossman is an American psychiatrist and activist aligned with anti-LGBT and conservative advocacy organizations. She is an opponent of gender affirming medical care for transgender people, and opposes sex education in schools, which she describes as a "Marxist approach to human development".

== Views and activities ==
Grossman earned her undergraduate degree at Bryn Mawr College and received her Doctor of Medicine (M.D.) degree from New York University. She completed her residency in adult psychiatry at North Shore University Hospital, where she remained as a fellow in child and adolescent psychiatry for two years.

In the years that followed, she worked as a psychiatrist at various hospitals, focusing predominantly on adolescent patients.

Grossman is currently a senior fellow of Do No Harm, an organization known for its support of bans on transgender healthcare, and a psychiatric consultant for the American College of Pediatricians, an organization known for its opposition to abortion, gender-affirming care, and marriage equality and support of conversion therapy.

Grossman has endorsed conversion therapy for gay people. In 2013, she spoke at a religious World Congress of Families conference in Australia in opposition to same-sex marriage.

In 2024, she attended a conference hosted by the Alliance for Therapeutic Choice and Scientific Integrity (formerly the "National Association for Research and Therapy of Homosexuality").

Grossman opposes gender-affirming care for transgender people. She has been involved in amicus briefs arguing against gender affirming policies. Grossman wrote an affidavit in support of a Canadian father's attempt to block his teenage transgender son from taking testosterone; the court ruled in favor of the child. Grossman co-authored amicus briefs and commentaries with members of ACPeds and worked with them and members of the Catholic Medical Association to support Florida's ban on Medicaid coverage for gender affirming care.

Grossman is an opponent of sexual education in schools, which she describes as a "Marxist approach to human development". In 2013, she was commissioned by a New Zealand conservative lobby group, Family First, to author a report which condemned sex education in the country. Critics argued that sex education aims to reduce high-risk behavior and improve sexual health and safety of young people.

Grossman appeared in Matt Walsh's 2022 film What is a Woman?. In 2023, Grossman participated in the detransition media project Identity Crisis, which was founded by the Independent Women's Forum.

In 2023, Grossman promoted a false claim that the CDC endorsed drugs to allow transgender women to breastfeed.

== Books ==
- Wonder of Becoming You: How a Jewish Girl Grows Up (Jerusalem; New York : Feldheim Publishers, 1988). ISBN 0873064380 LCCN 88-7093
- Unprotected: A Campus Psychiatrist Reveals How Political Correctness in Her Profession Endangers Every Student (Sentinel, 2007) ISBN 9781595230256 LCCN 2006-44355
- You're Teaching My Child What?: A Physician Exposes the Lies of Sex Ed and How They Harm Your Child (Regnery, 2009) ISBN 9781596985544
- Lost in Trans Nation: A Child Psychiatrist's Guide Out of the Madness (Skyhorse, 2023) ISBN 9781510777743
