= Yoshi Sodeoka =

Japanese artist and musician

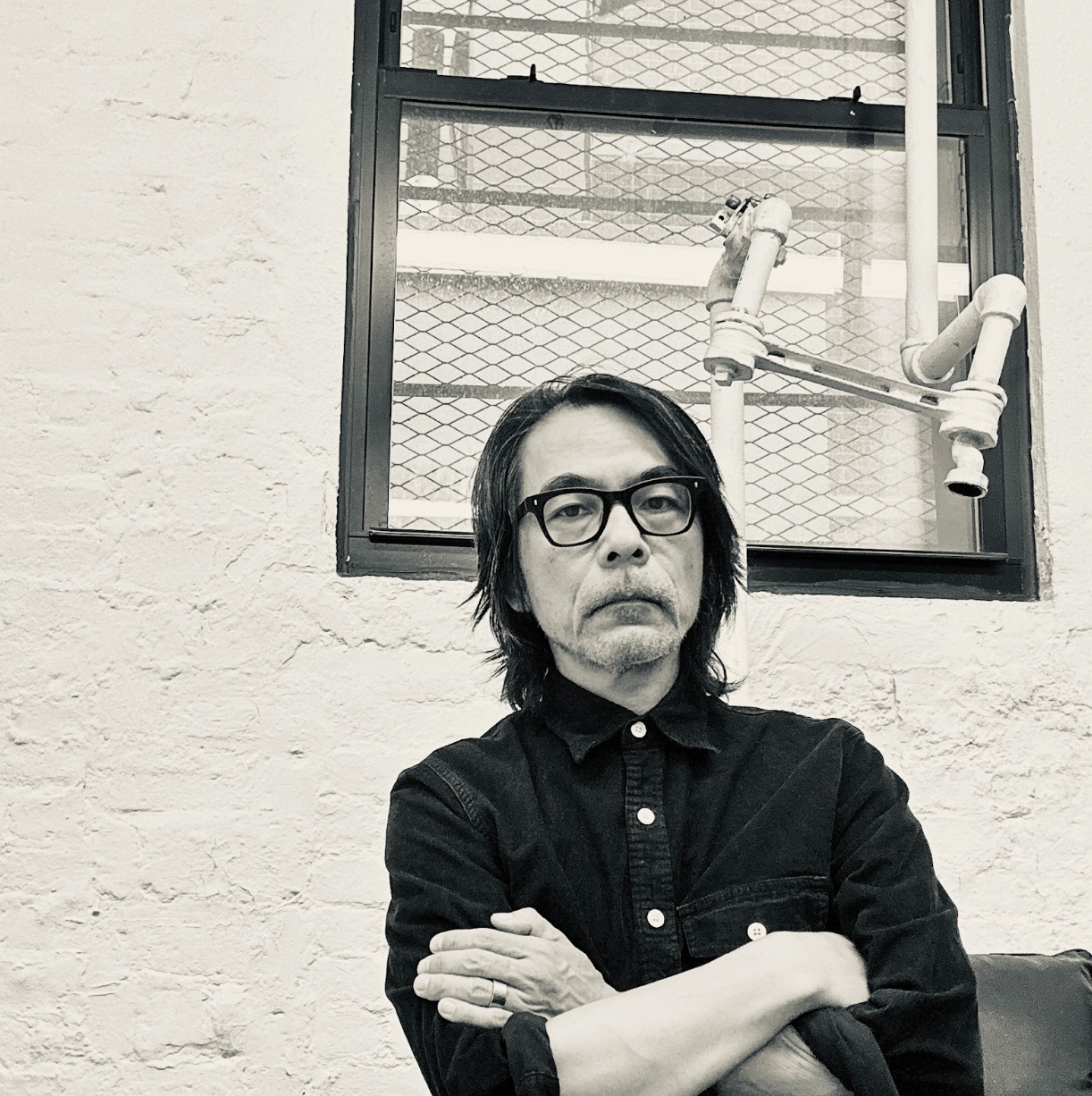
- Sodeoka in 2024
- Born: 1967 (age 58–59); Hiroshima, Japan
- Other name: Yoshihide Sodeoka
- Occupation: Artist
- Known for: Digital video art
- Website: sodeoka.com

Yoshi Sodeoka is a Japanese-born, New York City-based multimedia artist whose body of work spans digital video, animation, print, and sound. He uses video feedback, generative processes, and experimental sound to break the original structure and integrity of images and music and find new forms of artistic expression. His projects have been presented by museums, galleries, and media platforms internationally, and his work is held in the permanent collections of the Whitney Museum of American Art and the Museum of the Moving Image in New York City and the San Francisco Museum of Modern Art.

== Life ==
Sodeoka was born in Hiroshima, Japan. While living in Yokohama, he played live music in the Japanese hardcore scene, influenced by English punk bands Sex Pistols, The Damned (band), Discharge (band), and GBH (band), and Japanese bands Gauze (band) and Lip Cream. Visually, he was influenced by the album design work of Roger Dean (artist) and Jamie Reid.

He relocated to New York City in 1989 to study at Pratt Institute and has lived in Manhattan since then.

== Career ==
In 1996, he became Creative Director of Word Magazine, an early interactive multimedia online magazine active from 1995 to 2000. He also created his own artistic work throughout that period.

Sodeoka has also created editorial work for articles on technology, culture, and politics in publications including The New York Times, Wired, and ProPublica.

He has cited Op artists Bridget Riley and Victor Vasarely as influences and has been inspired by the work of Nam June Paik, Christian Marclay, John Cage, and Brian Eno. His work has been associated with Psychedelic and Abstract art.

The anti-commercial ethos of punk rock is a through line across his work.

==== Notable art projects ====
===== 2001 =====
Prototype #31: C404.40.40.31, a 31-minute audiovisual work combining animated graphics, found television footage, and an original experimental electronic noise score composed by Sodeoka. The project premiered at Digital Dumbo in September 2001 and was later archived by transmediale.

===== 2004 =====
ASCII BUSH, an ASCII-based video work presenting U.S. political speeches as digital abstraction, first showcased through Turbulence.org and later archived by the Rhizome ArtBase.

===== 2005–2012 =====
Between 2005 and 2012, Sodeoka released a series of experimental audiovisual works exploring video feedback, generative abstraction, and noise-based sound design. These included the DVD release Noise Driven Ambient Audio and Visuals and Video Metal, a limited-edition audiovisual publication reviewed by Neural magazine. During this period, he also developed telecommunications-themed digital works through Turbulence.org, including 35.23N 139.30E [FAC 3097] E5150xx – Digital/Analog Intermix.

===== 2013 =====
Sodeoka founded the experimental video art collective Undervolt & Co., focused on abstract audiovisual publishing and online exhibition formats.

===== 2021 =====
Prism Break – Ambient Swim, an immersive audiovisual series that premiered on HBO Max as part of the Adult Swim Festival.

===== 2023 =====
Wind Flags #4, a large-scale mural commissioned for Memorial Sloan Kettering Cancer Center, composed from algorithmically generated video stills.

===== 2024 =====
The Flood, a generative digital art series exploring predator–prey simulations, released through Verse Works.

===== 2025 =====
Sodeoka’s work was presented across Times Square’s digital billboards as part of its Midnight Moment public art program.

In 2025, large-scale projection works by Sodeoka were featured at the Kinomural new-media festival in Wrocław, Poland.

His work was featured in the immersive digital art group exhibition Akari in Mexico City.

==== Music video projects ====
Sodeoka has directed music videos for a range of international recording artists, frequently incorporating generative and abstract visual systems.

- The Presets – "Youth in Trouble" (2012)
- Tame Impala – "Elephant" (2012)
- Yeasayer – "PSCYVOTV" (2012)
- MYMK – "Drag" (2015)
- Digitalism – "Utopia" (2016)
- Mark Stoermer – "39 Steps (Shannoncut Remix)" (2017)
- Oliver Coates – "Norrin Radd Dreaming" (2018)
- Oneohtrix Point Never – "Magic OPN" (2020)
- Max Cooper – "Spike" (2020)
- Genghis Tron – "Pyrocene" (2021)
- Metallica – "You Must Burn!" (2023)
- Max Cooper – "Fibonacci Sequence" (2024)
- Oneohtrix Point Never – "Measuring Ruins" (2025)

==== Illustrations and animations for publications ====
Sodeoka has contributed animated and digital visual works to major international publications, integrating motion-based graphics into editorial storytelling.

- The New York Times – Addicted to Distraction (2015)
- The New York Times Sunday Review – Do You Believe in God, or Is That a Software Glitch (2016)
- Wired – How One Woman's Digital Life Was Weaponized Against Her (2017)
- MIT Technology Review – Paying with Your Face (2017)
- Wired – The Dawn of Twitter and the Age of Awareness (2018)
- The Atlantic – How to Put Out Democracy’s Dumpster Fire (2021)
- ProPublica – Why It’s Hard to Sanction Ransomware Groups (2022)
- The New Yorker – Cory Doctorow Wants You to Know What Computers Can and Can’t Do (2022)
- The New York Times – Starfield’s 1,000 Planets May Be One Giant Leap for Game Design (2023)
