= Daron Murphy =

American singer-songwriter

Daron Murphy is co-founder of the social justice creative agency Art Not War. Since the agency was founded in 2011, Murphy has written, directed and produced hundreds of short films and online videos that have earned billions of views worldwide.

Murphy is also a musician and composer for film and television. In 2016, he scored Henry Louis Gates, Jr's PBS documentary series, Black America Since MLK: And Still I Rise. He composed musical scores for the feature-length documentary films, The End of America and MoveOn: The Movie. He has scored short films including Raving, directed by Julia Stiles, and Bring them Home, directed by Oliver Stone.

Murphy has written on popular culture for publications including The Wall Street Journal, Men's Vogue, Bloomberg Businessweek, The Huffington Post, Entertainment Weekly, and Vibe. He was an editor and producer of the pioneering mid-1990s web site Word.com.

In 2019, Murphy served as a fellow of the NSquare Innovators Network.

As a musician, Murphy was known for his work as a guitarist, harmonica player and songwriter with the retro-soul rock group, The Little Death. He toured Europe with Moby, as his guitar player, in 2005.

From 1992 until 1995, Murphy was the primary songwriter, singer, and guitarist (along with bass player Jonny Farrow and late drummer Chris Brown), for indie rock band Philco Bendyx, releasing an EP on John Flansburgh's (They Might be Giants) Hello Recording Club.

In 1998, Murphy formed The Sixes, a short-lived 1960s garage-style dance/rock ensemble. In 2000, Murphy co-founded Rene Risque and the Art Lovers, with primary songwriter and vocalist Andy Boose—a cabaret/rock/disco project in which each member of the band assumed the identity of a sleazy eurotrash decadent. Murphy's assumed name in the group was Dolce Fino.

Around the same time, Murphy was wed to singer and political activist Laura Dawn.
