= I.D. (magazine) =

American design magazine (1954–2010)

- Categories: Architecture
- Frequency: Eight times a year
- Founded: 1954
- Final issue: 2010
- Company: F+W Media
- Country: United States
- ISSN: 0894-5373

I.D. (The International Design Magazine) was a magazine covering the art, business, and culture of design. It was published eight times a year by F+W Media.

== History ==
I.D. was founded in 1954 as Industrial Design. The name was later abbreviated to an initialism; in the 1980s, the initials came to stand for International Design to reflect the magazine's broadened scope.

Since 1954, the magazine published the Annual Design Review, a juried design competition curated by I.D. staff and industry practitioners.

I.D. won five National Magazine Awards: three for General Excellence (1995, 1997, 1999), one for Design (1997), and one for Special Interest (2000).

The last issue of I.D. was published in January/February 2010.

In June 2011, I.D. magazine was re-launched online in partnership with Behance. The new I.D. magazine featured user-submitted designs that were curated to offer examples of innovative work happening today.

By March 2016, the magazine's website had been shut down.
