= Outline of green politics =

The following outline is provided as an overview and topical guide to green politics:

Green politics – political ideology that aims for the creation of an ecologically sustainable society rooted in environmentalism, social liberalism, and grassroots democracy. It began taking shape in the western world in the 1970s; since then Green parties have developed and established themselves in many countries across the globe, and have achieved some electoral success.

== Nature of green politics ==
Green politics can be described as:

- activism
- an ideology
  - a political ideology
- a social movement
  - a political movement
    - part of the environmental movement

=== Essence of green politics ===
- Green nationalism
- Green party

=== Contributing philosophies ===
- Agrarianism – Philosophy supporting rural society
- Environmentalism – Philosophy about Earth protection
- Localism – Political philosophy prioritizing local governance and community control
- Social liberalism – Political ideology within liberalism

=== Overlapping movements ===
Green politics shares many ideas with the following movements:

- Animal rights movement
- Anti-globalization movement
- Alter-globalization movement
- Climate movement
- Conservation movement
- Environmental movement
- Feminist movement
- Local food movement
- Peace movement

== Green schools of thought ==
=== Bright green environmentalism ===
- Car-free movement – Movement to reduce the use of private vehicles
- Climate movement
- Conservation movement – Sociopolitical advocacy for protecting natural resources
- Eco-modernism – Environmental movement emphasizing technological innovation for sustainability
  - Ecological modernization – Environmental theory linking economic growth with sustainable technological solutions
  - Prometheanism – Philosophy advocating human progress through technology and mastery over nature
  - Technogaianism – Favor of technology to fight environmental threats
- Positive environmentalism

=== Deep green environmentalism ===
- Anti-consumerism – Sociopolitical ideology
  - Degrowth – Philosophy calling for reduced consumption and production to achieve sustainability
- Anti-globalization movement – Worldwide political movement against multinational corporations
  - Alter-globalization movement – Advocacy for globalization models prioritizing human rights, environment, and fairness
  - Global justice movement – Network of organized efforts around international justice
- Anti-nuclear movement – Movement opposing nuclear energy and weapons due to environmental and safety concerns
- Bioregionalism – Philosophy advocating governance and culture based on ecological and geographic regions
- Ecoauthoritarianism – Political ideology combining environmental protection with authoritarian governance
- Ecocentrism – Stance of environmentalism that values should be centered around nature, not humanity
- Eco-fascism – Authoritarian environmentalist ideology
- Green anarchism – Branch of anarchism focused on the environment
  - Anarcho-naturism – Practice and advocacy of social nudity
  - Anarcho-primitivism – Anarchist critique of civilization
    - Rewilding (anarchism) – Anarchist critique of civilization
  - Communalism (Bookchin) – American social theorist (1921–2006), proposed that communities manage affairs using popular assemblies
    - Eco-communalism – International policy development body
      - Back-to-the-land movement – Agrarian movement of former urbanites
    - Democratic confederalism – Political ideology and government structure
    - Green municipalism – Political philosophy advocating sustainability through grassroots municipal institutions
    - Libertarian municipalism – Local self-government political system
    - Social ecology (Bookchin) – concerned with the relationship between ecological and social issues
  - Inclusive democracy – Greek political philosopher, economist and writer
- Neo-Luddism – Philosophy opposing modern technology
- Radical environmentalism
  - Animal rights movement – Social movement for animal consideration
  - Deep Green Resistance – Radical environmental movement
  - Earth liberation movement – Part of radical environmentalism

=== Light green environmentalism ===
- Free-market environmentalism – Political and economic philosophy
  - Eco-capitalism – View that capital exists in nature as "natural capital"
    - Sustainable capitalism – Capitalism based on sustainable practices
  - Georgism – Economic philosophy centered on common ownership of land
    - Geolibertarianism – Political and economic ideology integrating libertarianism with Georgism
  - Green libertarianism – Political ideology with mixed green and libertarian beliefs
- Green conservatism – Combination of conservatism and environmentalism
  - Fiscal environmentalism – Economic approach linking fiscal policy with environmental goals
- Green liberalism – Political ideology

=== Other ===
- Eco-feminism – Approach to feminism influenced by ecologist movement
- Eco-nationalism – Political ideology combining environmentalism with nationalism
  - Green Zionism – Branch of Zionism
- Green left – Ideology merging aspects of socialism with green politics, ecology and alter-globalization
  - Eco-socialism – Ideology merging aspects of socialism with green politics, ecology and alter-globalization
- Localism – Political philosophy prioritizing local governance and community control
- Queer ecology – Environmental approach informed by queer theory
- Green syndicalism – Branch of anarchism focused on the environment

=== Opposition ===
- Anti-environmentalism

=== Religious variants ===
- Ecotheology – Theological reflection on the environment
- Spiritual ecology – Field in religion, conservation, and academia
- Christian environmentalism
  - Evangelical environmentalism – Christian environmental movement
- Islamic environmentalism, also known as Hima – Traditional Arabian land-stewardship system
- Jewish environmentalism – Jewish environmental ethics and stewardship
- Maori environmentalism, also known as Kaitiakitanga – Māori concept of guardianship

== Values and principles ==
- The four pillars – Political ideology focused on establishing an ecologically sustainable society
  - Ecological wisdom – Philosophy current
  - Grassroots democracy – Type that favors individual activism
  - Nonviolence – Principle or practice of not causing harm to others
    - Pacifism – Philosophy opposing war or violence
    - Peace movement – Social movement against a particular war or wars
  - Social justice – Concept in political philosophy
    - Human rights – Fundamental rights belonging to all humans
      - Civil liberties – Civil rights and freedoms that provide individual specific rights
    - Social equality – Equality for all people within society
      - Economic egalitarianism – School of thought favoring equality for all people
        - Equal opportunity – Aspect of social equality
    - Solidarity – Unity of feeling or action on a common interest
- Global Greens Charter – Global charter for Green political principles

=== Democracy ===
- Consensus democracy – Form of government
- Deliberative democracy – Form of democracy focusing on deliberation and informed decision-making
- Direct democracy – Form of democracy
- Participatory democracy – Model of democracy
- Grassroots democracy – Type that favors individual activism
- Bioregional democracy – Philosophy advocating governance and culture based on ecological and geographic regions
- Inclusive Democracy – Involves the equal distribution of power at all levels

=== Environment ===
- Ecotheology – Theological reflection on the environment
- Environmentalism – Philosophy about Earth protection
- Green building – Environmentally responsible construction principles
- Green technology – Technical and technological processes for protection of the environment
- Human ecology – Study of humans and their environment
- Political ecology – Study of political, economic and social factors about environmental issues
- Social ecology (Bookchin) – concerned with the relationship between ecological and social issues
- Sustainable development – Mode of human development

=== Feminism ===
- Ecofeminism – Approach to feminism influenced by ecologist movement
- Feminist economics – Gender-aware branch of economics

=== Green economics ===
- Eco-capitalism – View that capital exists in nature as "natural capital"
- Ecological economics – Interdependence of human economies and natural ecosystems
- Eco-socialism – Ideology merging aspects of socialism with green politics, ecology and alter-globalization
- Ecotax – Compulsory fee intended to discourage environmentally harmful acts
- Circular economy – Production model to minimise wastage and emissions
- Feminist economics – Gender-aware branch of economics
- Free-market environmentalism – Political and economic philosophy
- Georgism – Economic philosophy centered on common ownership of land
- Geolibertarianism – Political and economic ideology integrating libertarianism with Georgism

== Policy issues ==
A few issues affect most of the green parties around the world, and can often inhibit global cooperation. Some affect structure, and others affect policy:

- Anti-nuclear – Movement opposing nuclear energy and weapons due to environmental and safety concerns
- Bioregionalism – Philosophy advocating governance and culture based on ecological and geographic regions
- Biosafety – Prevention of large-scale loss of biological integrity
- Biosecurity – Preventive measures designed to reduce the risk of infectious disease transmission
- Electoral reform – Change in an electoral system
- Fundamentalism vs. Realism
- Green transport hierarchy – Prioritising vulnerable sustainable road users
- Greenwashing – Misleading environmental marketing claims
- Indigenous peoples
- Land reform – Changing of laws, regulations, or customs regarding land ownership
- Natural capitalism – 1999 book by Hawken, Lovins, & Lovins
- Primate extinction – Family of primates
- Prometheanism – Philosophy advocating human progress through technology and mastery over nature
- Rainforest destruction – Type of forest with high rainfall
- Sustainable transport – Transport with sustainable social and environmental impacts

On matters of ecology, extinction, biosafety, biosecurity, and health security, "Greens" generally agree. There are very substantial policy differences between and among Green Parties in various countries and cultures, and a continuing debate about the degree to which natural ecology and human needs align. Agreement on particular issues is often reached using a consensus decision making process.

== Organizations ==
=== Worldwide ===
- Friends of the Earth – International network of environmental organizations
- Greenpeace – Environmental non-governmental organization
- Global Greens – International organization of political parties
- World Ecological Parties – International network of Green-aligned ecological parties

=== Green federations ===
The member parties of the Global Greens (see for details) are organised into four continental federations:

- Federation of Green Parties of Africa – Political umbrella body
- Federation of the Green Parties of the Americas / Federación de los Partidos Verdes de las Américas – International organization of political parties
- Asia-Pacific Green Network – Federation of parties
- European Federation of Green Parties – Green European political party

The European Federation of Green Parties formed itself as the European Green Party on 22 February 2004, in the run-up to European Parliament elections in June, 2004, a further step in trans-national integration.

=== Europe ===
- European Green Party – Green European political party
- European Federation of Green Parties/European Free Alliance – Green political group of the European Parliament
- European United Left–Nordic Green Left – Left-wing political group of the European Parliament

==== Green parties in Europe ====
- Austrian Green Party – Austrian political party
- Green Party of Armenia – Political party in Armenia
- Groen – Flemish political party in Belgium
- Ecolo
- Green Party (Czech Republic) – Czech political party
- Estonian Greens – Political party in Estonia
- Vihreä Liitto – Finnish political party
- Les Verts – French green political party
- Alliance 90/The Greens – Green political party in Germany
- Green Party faction (Bundestag) – Parliamentary subgroup of Germany's Green Party
- Left-Green Movement
- Green Party (Ireland) – Irish political party
- Federation of the Greens
- Latvian Green Party – Political party in Latvia
- Free List (Liechtenstein)
- Environment Party The Greens (Norway) – Norwegian green political party
- The Greens (Poland) – Polish political party
- Portugal
  - The Greens (Portugal) – Eco-socialist political party in Portugal
  - Land Party (Spain), also known as Partido da Terra
  - Partido da Terra – Centre-right green political party in Portugal
- Miljöpartiet de Gröna – Swedish political party
- Green Party of Switzerland – Swiss political party
- Green Liberal Party of Switzerland – Swiss political party
- GroenLinks – Political party in the Netherlands
- The Greens (Netherlands) – Political party in the Netherlands
- Party of Greens of Ukraine – Political party in Ukraine
- United Kingdom
  - Green Party in Northern Ireland – Political party in Northern Ireland
  - Green Party of England and Wales – Political party in England and Wales
    - Wales Green Party
    - London Green Party – Regional party in London, England
  - Scottish Greens – Political party in Scotland
- Spain
  - Initiative for Catalonia Greens – Political party in Spain
  - Greens Equo

=== Africa and Asia ===
- Ha-Yerukim – Political party in Israel
- Green Party of Pakistan
- ECOPEACE Party – Political party in South Africa
- Mazingira Green Party of Kenya – Political party in Kenya
- Rainbow and Greens
- Green Party of Malaysia – Political party of Malaysia
- Green Party Taiwan – Political party in Taiwan
- Federation of Green Parties of Africa – Political umbrella body

=== Americas ===
- Federation of Green Parties of the Americas – International organization of political parties

==== Green parties in the Americas ====
- Green Ecological Party of Mexico – Mexican political party
- Green Party of Canada – Federal political party in Canada
  - Green Party of British Columbia – Provincial political party in Canada
  - Green Party of Ontario – Provincial political party in Canada
  - List of Green party leaders in Canada
  - List of Green politicians who have held office in Canada
- Green Party (United States) – American political party
  - Greens/Green Party USA
  - Boston Proposal – Aspect of U.S. political history

=== Oceania ===
- Australian Greens Party – Political party
- United Tasmania Party
- Green Party of Aotearoa New Zealand – Left-wing green political party in New Zealand
- Values Party – Political party in New Zealand
- Wild Greens – Left-wing green political party in New Zealand

=== Regional variants ===
==== African ====
- South Africa

==== American ====
- United States – Organized environmental movement in the US

==== Asian ====
- Bangladesh – Movement for addressing environmental issues
- China – Movement for addressing environmental issues
- India – Movement for addressing environmental issues
  - Chipko movement – 1970s Indian forest conservation movement
- Israel – Branch of Zionism
- South Korea – Movement for addressing environmental issues
- Taiwan – Movement for addressing environmental issues
- Pan-Green Coalition – politics of Taiwan

==== European ====
- Switzerland

==== Oceanian ====
- Australia
- New Zealand

== Alliances ==
- Red-green alliance – Political coalition between parties
- Teal Deal – Alliance between two political parties of New Zealand

== Notable persons ==
=== Who attained a seat or government position ===
==== Americas ====
- Ingrid Betancourt – Colombia; presidency candidate 2002, kidnapped 2002–2008
- Sergio Fajardo – Colombia, ex mayor of Medellin and presidential candidate of 2018
- Claudia López – Colombia, first woman and LGBTQ+ mayor of bogota
- Elizabeth May – Canada; current leader of the Green Party of Canada and first Green member of the Canadian Parliament
- Jill Stein – USA; US Green Party's Presidential Candidate for 2012, 2016, and 2024, held a local position in Lexington until 2010
- Jason West – USA; former mayor of New Paltz, New York and same-sex marriage activist
- Blair Wilson – Canada; former liberal member of the Canadian Parliament, later became member of the Green Party
- Adolfo Aguilar Zínser – Mexico; Green Senate 1997–2000

==== Asia ====
- Liaquat Ali Khan – Pakistan; first Prime Minister of the modern Pakistan
- Gina Lopez – Filipino environmentalist and philanthropist (1953–2019)
- Mohamed Nasheed – President of the Maldives from 2008 to 2012
- Emil Salim – Indonesian economist and politician
- Alon Tal – Israeli politician, activist, and academic

==== Europe ====
- Annalena Baerbock – German politician and diplomat (born 1980)
- Natalie Bennett – United Kingdom; leader of the Green Party of England and Wales 2012–2016
- Joseph Beuys – Germany; artist and founder member of the German Green Party
- Martin Bursík – The Czech Republic; former leader of the Czech Green Party and Minister of the Environment
- Tim Beaumont – United Kingdom; late peer in the House of Lords
- Daniel Cohn-Bendit – France / Germany; former student leader in 1968 and member of the European Parliament 1994–2014
- Vera Dua – Belgium; former Flemish Green Party leader and Minister of Agriculture and Environment 1999–2003
- Indulis Emsis – Latvia; Prime Minister of Latvia for ten months in 2004, first Green politician to lead a country
- Joschka Fischer – Germany; leading figure in the German Greens and Vice Chancellor of Germany and Foreign Minister 1998–2005
- Monica Frassoni – Italy; co-chair of the European Greens group in the European Parliament 2002–2009
- Robert Habeck – German politician (born 1969)
- Femke Halsema – Netherlands; leader of the Dutch GreenLeft parliamentary party 2002–2010
- Petra Kelly – Germany; founding member of the German Greens
- Winfried Kretschmann – Germany; Ministerpräsident Baden-Württemberg
- Fritz Kuhn – Germany; former chair of German Green's parliamentary group 2005-2009 and first Green mayor of Stuttgart since 2012
- Renate Künast – Germany; German Minister of Consumer Protection, Food and Agriculture 2001-2005 and chair of the German Green's parliamentary group 2005–2013
- Brice Lalonde – France; French Minister of the Environment 1991-1992 and founder of the green party Génération Ecologie
- Alain Lipietz – France; Green engineer and economist; member of the European Parliament 1999–2009
- Caroline Lucas – United Kingdom; co-leader of the Green Party of England and Wales 2016–Present and first Green member of the Houses of Commons since 2010
- Ulrike Lunacek – Austria; Vice President of the European Parliament since 2014
- Noël Mamère – France; Green Party's presidential candidate 2002 and former member of the European Parliament
- Robert Cramer – Switzerland; Green representative in the Swiss Council of States
- Åsa Romson – Sweden; Swedish Minister for the Environment and Deputy Prime Minister since 2014
- Paul Rosenmöller – Netherlands; leader of the Dutch GreenLeft Party 1994–2002
- Claudia Roth – Germany; German Green Party leader from 2004 to 2013 and Vice President of the Bundestag since 2013
- Otto Schily – Germany; German Interior Minister 1998–2005; later switched to SPD
- Bart Staes – Belgium; Green member of the European Parliament since 1999
- Jaromír Štětina – Czech Republic; Green Senator 2004-2014 and member of the European parliament since 2014
- Jürgen Trittin – Germany; German Minister for the Environment, Nature Conservation and Nuclear Safety 1998-2005 and chair of the Green parliamentary group 2009–2013
- Alexander Van der Bellen – Austria; leader of the Austrian Green Party 1997–2008; President of Austria since 2017, making him the second green head of state worldwide, the first directly elected by popular vote
- Raimonds Vējonis – Latvia; President of Latvia since 2015, making him the first green head of state worldwide

==== Others ====
- Bob Brown – Australia; former leader of the Australian Greens and Senator 1996–2012
- Hilda Heine – President of the Marshall Islands (2016–2020; 2024–present)
- Anote Tong – 4th president of Kiribati

=== Who are/were otherwise involved in politics ===
- Baba Amte – Indian social worker, reformer and activist (1914–2008)
- Sunderlal Bahuguna – Indian environmental activist (1927–2021)
- Nnimmo Bassey – Nigerian architect and activist (born 1958)
- Chandi Prasad Bhatt – Indian environmentalist
- Jello Biafra – USA; singer-songwriter and runner-up in the US Green Party's presidential nomination 2000
- David Cobb – USA; US Green Party's presidential candidate 2004
- Peter Camejo – USA; three-time Green Californian gubernatorial candidate and independent vice-presidential candidate 2004
- Gaura Devi – Indian activist (1925–1991)
- Felix Dodds – United Kingdom; environmental author, futurist, and activist
- René Dumont – France; first Green presidential candidate 1974, forefather of the French Green Party Les Verts and founding member of ATTAC
- Jim Harris – Canada; former leader of the Canadian Green Party 2003–2006
- Winona LaDuke – USA; Native American activist and environmentalist; US Green Party's vice-presidential candidate 1996 and 2000
- Liang Congjie – Chinese historian and activist
- Wangari Maathai – Kenya; environmental and political activist; Nobel Peace Prize winner 2004
- Ralph Nader – USA; US Green Party's Presidential Candidate 1996 and 2000 as well as independent Presidential Candidate in 2004 and 2008
- Kumi Naidoo – South African human rights and climate justice activist (born 1965)
- Seub Nakhasathien – Thai conservationist (1949–1990)
- Medha Patkar – Indian social activist (born 1954)
- Jonathon Porritt – United Kingdom; environmentalist and advocate of the Green Party of England and Wales
- Prafulla Samantara – Indian environmental activist
- Ken Saro-Wiwa – Nigerian social rights activist (1941–1995)
- E. F. Schumacher – Germany / United Kingdom; Green economic thinker
- Vandana Shiva – Indian philosopher, scientist and environmentalist
- Peter Singer – Australia; moral philosopher and Green candidate for the Australian Senate in 1996
- Charlene Spretnak – USA; ecofeminist and cofounder of the US Green Party

== Publications ==
- List of environmental books
  - List of Australian environmental books
  - List of books about energy issues
  - List of books about nuclear issues
- List of environmental journals
  - List of scholarly journals in environmental economics
  - List of environmental law reviews and journals
    - List of environmental lawsuits
  - List of ornithology journals
  - List of wildlife magazines
- List of environmental periodicals
- List of environmental agreements
- List of environmental reports
- List of environmental websites

== See also ==
- Green on the outside but red on the inside – Ideology merging aspects of socialism with green politics, ecology and alter-globalization
- Activism – Efforts to make change in society toward a perceived greater good
- Conference of the parties – Supreme governing body of an international convention
- Climate movement
- Eco-capitalism – View that capital exists in nature as "natural capital"
- Ecocentrism – Stance of environmentalism that values should be centered around nature, not humanity
- Ecological humanities – Study of environmental issues, nature and culture
- Environmental groups and resources serving K–12 schools
- Environmental organizations
- Environmental protection – Practice of protecting the natural environment
- Environmental tariff – Tariff to equalise externality costs
- Environmentalism – Philosophy about Earth protection
- Free-market environmentalism – Political and economic philosophy
- Green International – International political organization
- Green Zionism – Branch of Zionism
- List of conservation topics
- List of conservation issues
- List of environmental disasters – Cataloging of environmental disasters
- List of environmental organizations
- Lists of environmental topics
- List of green parties
- List of sustainability topics
- Nordic agrarian parties – Political party type in the Nordic countries
- Viridian Greens – Aesthetic facet of bright green environmentalism
