= Jon Lebkowsky =

American writer

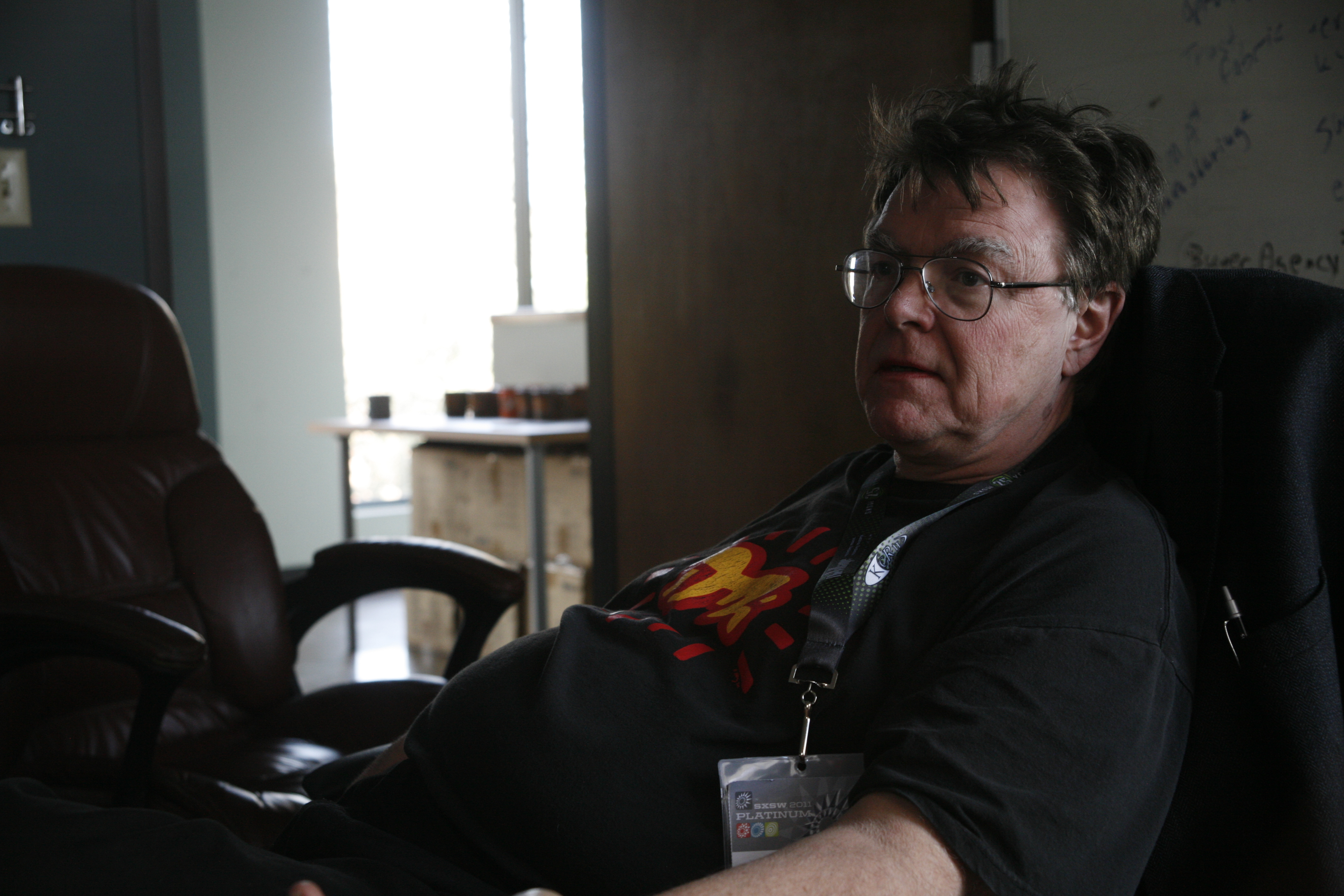
- Jon Lebkowsky at SXSW in 2011
- Born: April 20, 1949 (age 77)
- Occupations: Consultant, strategist, writer
- Spouse: Marsha Lebkowsky
- Writing career
- Subjects: Social web, web, cyberculture, Internet
- Website: weblogsky.com

Jon Lebkowsky (born April 20, 1949) is an American web consultant/developer, author, and activist who was the co-founder of FringeWare Review (along with Paco Nathan). FringeWare, an early attempt at ecommerce and online community, published a popular "magalog" called FringeWare Review, and a literary zine edited by Lebkowsky called Unshaved Truths. FringeWare's email list, called the FringeWare News Network, established an international following for the organization, which also opened a store in Austin, Texas.

Along with Nancy White, he co-hosts the ongoing Virtual Communities Conference, the Blog Conference, and the public Inkwell Conference at the seminal online community, the WELL. His weblog can be reached at Weblogsky.com. He lives in Austin, Texas.

== Internet Advocacy ==
Lebkowsky has a history of advocacy in support of a free and open Internet, and was a co-founder of EFF-Austin, an organization formed to be a chapter of the national Electronic Frontier Foundation (EFF). EFF-Austin became a separate organization with Lebkowsky as President. Lebkowsky coined the phrase Freedom to Connect, which became the name of an annual conference organized by David Isenberg, as an alternative to the term "network neutrality."

== Early history ==
Lebkowsky joined the WELL in 1990, and became a host or co-host of several forums on the conferencing system, including forums devoted to Factsheet Five, where he had a brief stint as book review editor, and Mondo 2000, where he wrote several articles and formed friendships with editors RU Sirius and Jude Milhon. Through the WELL, he also became associated with Howard Rheingold and Whole Earth Review, the Electronic Frontier Foundation, and boing boing, where he was associate editor. He had early associations with staff at Wired Magazine and conducted a regular, weekly series of chats called Electronic Frontiers Forum at HotWired. He was a subdomain editor for the Millennium Whole Earth Catalog and, in 1996, became a community host at Howard Rheingold's Electric Minds.

He has been interviewed about his pioneering work for the documentary Traceroute.

== Whole Foods Market ==
In 1997, he joined Whole Foods Market as its "Internet guy," to evangelize internally for the Internet and help lead their web-based ecommerce efforts, which ended in 2000 with the collapse of the so-called "Internet bubble." As Internet evangelist within the company, he advocated creation of online community at Whole Foods Market, and was Interactive Community Director for the ecommerce site that launched in 1998. When WholeFoods.com was replaced by the ambitious Whole People, Lebkowsky moved to Colorado and helped manage technology for the new enterprise until the company ended the project following the "dotcom bust."

== Web development, social software, and blogs ==
Lebkowsky turned to web development, and formed Polycot Consulting with Jeff Kramer and Matt Sanders on September 12, 2001. He became an advocate of Open Source systems based on PHP, and later Ruby on Rails.

He was an early influential social software advocate and one of the instigators of the Social Software Alliance. He was also an early blogger at Weblogsky. With Clay Shirky, he created You're It, a blog about tags and folksonomy. He also blogged at, and managed technology for, Worldchanging, an influential website focused on the future of sustainability that was inspired by the Viridian Design Movement.

== Bruce Sterling, Viridian Design, and the State of the World ==
He is a close friend of author Bruce Sterling, whom he has interviewed many times, and he created and operated the web site for Sterling's Viridian Design Movement. Lebkowsky and Sterling have a world-readable "State of the World" conversation for two weeks every January on The WELL.

== Writing ==
Lebkowsky has written articles and essays, and is a contributing writer and columnist at Worldchanging: A User's Guide for the 21st Century, and one of the contributors to the book Worldchanging (book). He was co-editor (with Mitch Ratcliffe) of the book Extreme Democracy

== Plutopia ==
In the early 2000s, Lebkowsky was a member of the board of the Central Texas Digital Convergence Initiative (http://dcitexas.org/). In 2005, with other members of the Digital Convergence Initiative, he worked on an installation intended for the then newly established South by Southwest Interactive trade show, which was referred to in planning stages as Futurama. Due to a lack of time and funds, the installation did not occur as planned, however from planning conversations, Lebkowsky had the idea for a think tank that produces events instead of white papers. With futurist Derek Woodgate and consultant David Demaris, he put this idea into practice, creating an installation called the DIY House of the Future for Maker Faire Austin in 2007. The installation was successful.

In a debriefing about the installation, a small group discussed the idea of doing more events focused on a future where everyone's home and experience could be self-configured. Lebkowsky tossed out the idea of "pluralist utopias," which led to adoption of the portmanteau "Plutopia."

Lebkowsky and Woodgate, partnering with Maggie Duval and Bon Davis, created an event company, Plutopia Productions. Plutopia produced four large events during SXSW Interactive in Austin, in 2008 at Scholz Garten, 2009 at Palmer Events Center, and 2010-2011 at the Mexican American Cultural Center.

Aligned with the 2011 event, Lebkowsky and producer Scoop Sweeney created a podcast called the Plutopia News Network.

Lebkowsky left Plutopia Productions, which later closed down. However in 2018 Lebkowsky and Sweeney revived the Plutopia News Network podcast. https://plutopia.io

== Other projects ==
He also led Austin's Wireless Future project for the IC² Institute in 2003–2004, and was a prominent figure within the Central Texas Digital Convergence Initiative, Bootstrap Austin, ATX Equation, and other local economic development projects.

He has been an advisor to the SXSW Interactive (SXSWi) conference for many years. He curated SXSWi tracks on wireless in 2004, digital convergence in 2006, and journalism in 2011. He was a cofounder and an original board member of the Society for Participatory Medicine, and currently manages the Society's social media presence. He formed an Austin-based social web consultancy, Social Web Strategies, where he was principal from 2006 to 2009. He was also instigator and principal of Plutopia Productions, a future-focused entertainment and production company. He has also been involved in Austin sustainability projects, including Austin EcoNetwork, Austin Green Art, Austin 350, Solar Austin, and the Center for Maximum Potential Building Systems.

In 2009 he left Social Web Strategies and returned to web consulting and development. He currently writes and speaks about the Internet, media, digital culture, and social technology. He has a web development and consulting company called Polycot Associates, a spinoff from Polycot Consulting.

== Writings ==
- List of links to writings and interviews.
- Posts at Worldchanging.com
- "In Your Facebook"
- "The Serious Play in Saving the World"
