= Kate Stohr =

American journalist

Kate Stohr is an American journalist, data scientist and civic activist based near San Francisco, CA. She was the director of a Data Science initiative at Simon & Schuster. She founded 99 Antennas. In 2016 she covered the U.S. Presidential Elections as a data journalist with Fusion and noted for her coverage of the online dominance of the Trump candidacy and for her reporting on the racial inequality in US prosecutor elections

In 1999 she co-founded Architecture for Humanity with Cameron Sinclair, a humanitarian architecture and design organization that focused on designing and building housing for people suffering from environmental disasters, refugee camps and other people in need. She was managing director of the organization until May 2013.

In 2006, Stohr published a compendium on socially conscious design, titled Design Like You Give A Damn: Architectural Responses to Humanitarian Crises (May 2006, Metropolis Books). In 2012 she and her co-authors released the follow-up, titled Design Like You Give A Damn [2]: Building Change From The Ground Up (May 2012, Abrams Books).

As a result of the 2006 TED Prize Stohr developed and launched the Open Architecture Network, the world's first open source community dedicated to improving living conditions through innovative and sustainable design. In 2012 the Open Architecture Network merged with Worldchanging to expand its work to both the built and natural environment.

In August 2008 Stohr was named as joint recipient of the Design Patron Award for the 2008 National Design Awards. In 2009 Stohr was awarded the Bicentenary Medal of the Royal Society of Arts for increasing people's resourcefulness.
