= Fred (chatbot) =

Fred, or FRED, was an early chatbot written by Robby Garner.

== History ==
The name Fred was initially suggested by Karen Lindsey, and then Robby jokingly came up with an acronym, "Functional Response Emulation Device." Fred has also been implemented as a Java application by Paco Nathan called JFRED.

Fred Chatterbot is designed to explore Natural Language communications between people and computer programs. In particular, this is a study of conversation between people and ways that a computer program can learn from other people's conversations to make its own conversations.

Fred used a minimalistic "stimulus-response" approach. It worked by storing a database of statements and their responses, and made its own reply by looking up the input statements made by a user and then rendering the corresponding response from the database. This approach simplified the complexity of the rule base, but required expert coding and editing for modifications.

Fred was a predecessor to Albert One, which Garner used in 1998 and 1999 to win the Loebner Prize.

== See also ==
- Albert One
- Conditioning
- Robby Garner
