= Bicentenary Medal of the Royal Society of Arts =

Bicentenary Medal
- Native name: RSA Bicentenary Medal
- Description: Recognition for applying art and design as instruments of civic innovation
- Country: United Kingdom
- Presented by: Royal Society of Arts (RSA)

The Bicentenary Medal of the Royal Society of Arts is awarded to "a person who, in a manner other than as an industrial designer, has applied art and design in great effect as instruments of civic innovation", as long as the winner is not already "bedecked with medals". It was first awarded in 1954, on the bicentenary of the Royal Society of Arts, and continues to be awarded annually with exceptions in 2003, 2006 and 2012.

The Medal was instituted in 1954 to commemorate the founding of the RSA over two hundred years earlier, and has been awarded to a variety of individuals for their outstanding contributions to the advancement of design in industry and society. In the RSA's current account of design, that contribution is interpreted as the most effective use of design to increase the resourcefulness of people and communities.

== List of Bicentenary Medallists ==
The medal's recipients are:

- 1954 Sir Colin Anderson
- 1955 Sir Charles Tennyson
- 1956 Sir Walter Worboys
- 1957 Sir Ernest Goodale
- 1958 John Gloag
- 1959 Frank A Mercer
- 1960 J. Cleveland Belle
- 1961 Audrey Withers
- 1962 Sir Robin Darwin
- 1963 Sir Paul Reilly
- 1964 Anthony S. Heal
- 1965 Hans Juda
- 1966 G. Graham McK Hughes
- 1967 Harold Glover
- 1968 Marcus Brumwell
- 1969 Sir Duncan Oppenheim
- 1970 T.H.C. Worthington
- 1971 Sir James Richards
- 1972 Rosamind Julius and Leslie Julius
- 1973 James S. Cousins
- 1974 Geoffrey Dunn
- 1975 Viscount Eccles
- 1976 Jack Pritchard
- 1977 Brooke Crutchley
- 1979 Sir William Coldstream
- 1980 Viscount Caldecote
- 1981 Deryck Healey
- 1982 Sir Terence Conran
- 1983 David Maroni
- 1984 Rowley Atterbury
- 1985 Sir Kenneth Corfield
- 1986 John Butcher
- 1987 Fiona MacCarthy
- 1988 Peter Gorb
- 1989 Louis van Praag
- 1990 Sir Peter Parker
- 1991 Sir Norman Payne
- 1992 Jeremy Fry
- 1993 Marquess of Bute
- 1994 Helen Auty
- 1995 Sir John Egan
- 1996 Zeev Aram
- 1997 Margaret Harris
- 1998 Sir John Sorrell CBE
- 1999 Stuart Lipton
- 2000 Wally Olins
- 2001 Sir Christopher Frayling
- 2002 Lady Hamlyn
- 2003 not awarded
- 2004 Deyan Sudjic
- 2005 Sheridan Coakley
- 2006 not awarded
- 2007 Lord Puttnam
- 2008 Tom Bloxham
- 2009 Cameron Sinclair and Kate Stohr
- 2010 David Constantine MBE
- 2011 Ken Arnold
- 2012 not awarded
- 2013 Barry Quirk CBE (Video of the talk on design and public services)
- 2014 Susan Woodward
- 2015 Dr Andrea Siodmok (Video of the talk on design thinking in Government)
- 2016 not awarded
- 2017 Mary V. Mullin
- 2018 Deanna Van Buren
- 2019 not awarded
- 2020 not awarded
- 2021 Daniel Christian Wahl
- 2022: Janine Benyus

== See also ==
- Albert Medal
- Benjamin Franklin Medal
