= FringeWare Review =

Cyberculture magazine

FringeWare Review was a magazine about subculture (predominantly cyberculture) published in Austin, Texas. Many of the publication's writers and editors were associated with other publications such as Boing Boing, Mondo 2000, Whole Earth Review, and Wired. The last issue of the magazine was #14, published in 1998. The magazine had an international circulation, distributed primarily by Fine Print, an Austin-based company that focused on 'zine distribution.

== History ==
FringeWare Review was established in 1994. The publication was co-founded by Jon Lebkowsky and Paco Nathan, with art director Monte McCarter and assistant editor Tiffany Lee Brown. The magazine's parent company, FringeWare, Inc., was the first company built on Internet community (the FringeWare email list, later referred to as the FringeWare News Network), and probably the first to use web technology when it appeared. FringeWare also had presences on The WELL and on Illuminati Online's Metaverse, which was conceived as a commercial multiuser object-oriented environment (MOO). Fringe Ware quickly built an international reputation through the Internet and the magazine. As online communities and the Internet spread in popularity during the 1990s, Fringe Ware became known as an early forebear to online commerce sites such as Amazon and to magazines such as Wired, which named Fringe Ware Review in its Top 10 List.

The company also owned an independent bookstore in Austin, Texas, that was an underground culture-hub for the city of Austin. Many performances and events were held at the bookstore, for example the first US performance of Austrian art pranksters monochrom in 1998. FringeWare was one of many independent businesses to disappear from Austin during the late 1990s.

Lebkowsky and Nathan, who met as Austin-based associate editors of the print version of bOING bOING, originally conceived the company as a way to bring micro producers of cool software and gadgets to market via ecommerce. They began with an email list, which had high adoption among an international set of technoculture mavens and Internet early adopters, and later became known as the FringeWare News Network. Nathan built a web site in 1992, creating an early custom content management system and online catalog of products. This would have become the first instance of ecommerce on the Internet, however credit card companies pre-SSL prohibited online sales, so the alternative was mail-order, and this required a print catalog. While hashing out plans for a FringeWare catalog, the two decided to create a magazine, inspired by Boing Boing and Whole Earth Review/Coevolution Quarterly, with a catalog in the back pages. Mark Frauenfelder of Boing Boing referred to the publication as a "magalog."

FringeWare has been, if not the home, then the battered half-way house for half of the memage in your head. Schwa, SubGenius, the FringeWare review, BoingBoing, them Bots which win the Turing Contest, the Dead Media Project. I'm sure they'd consider it an honour if you were in the area and find out - as was always FringeWare's creed - WHAT THE HELL IS GOING ON.

== See also ==
- Jon Lebkowsky
- Paco Nathan
- Clayton Counts
- Erik Davis
- Robby Garner
- John Shirley
- Don Webb
- Wiley Wiggins
