= Cameron Sinclair =

British designer and humanitarian

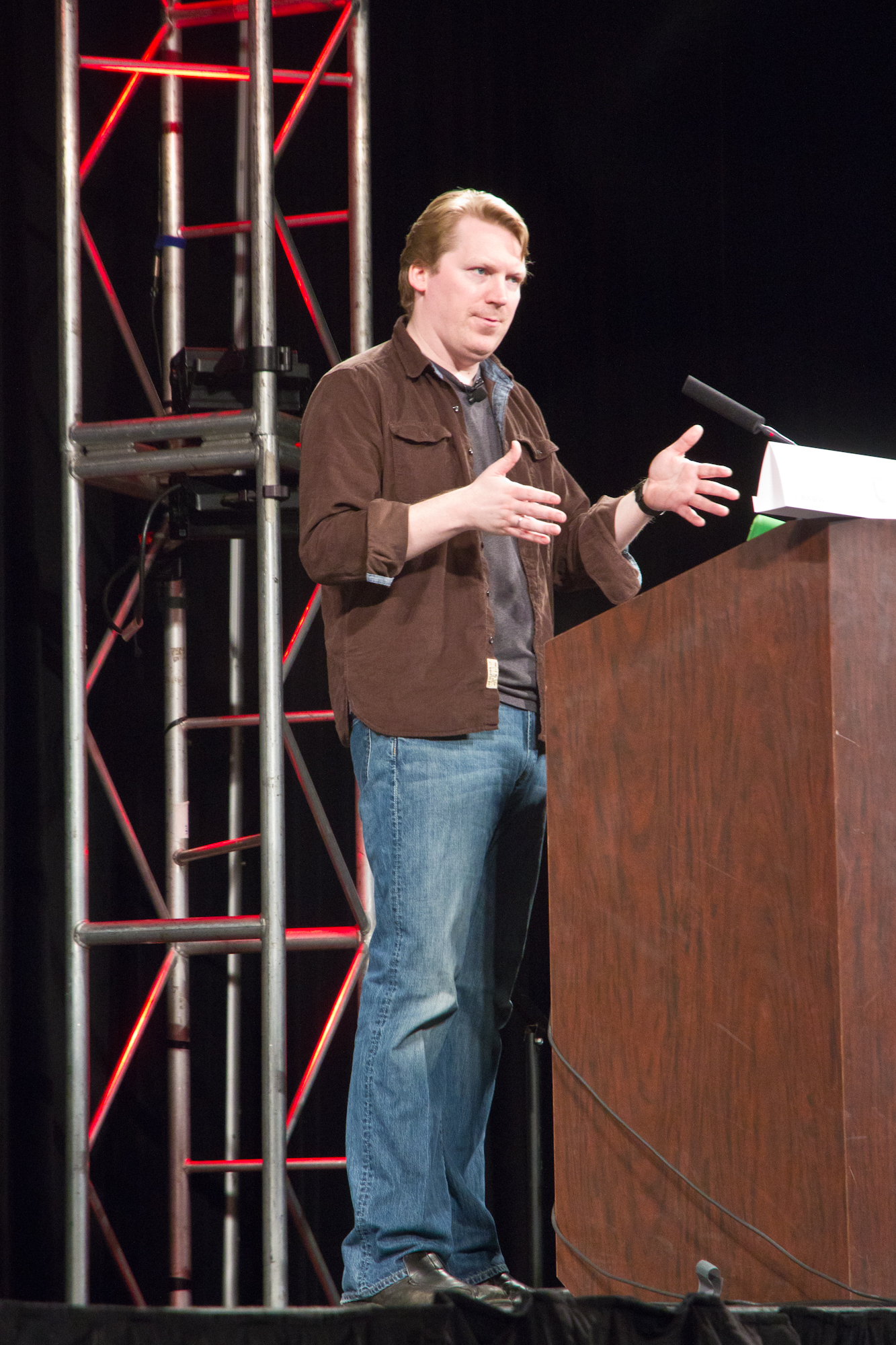
- Cameron Sinclair in 2011
- Born: 16 November 1973 (age 52); London, England
- Education: Kingswood School; University of Westminster; University College London
- Occupation: Architect
- Awards: TED Prize; National Design Award; Bicentenary Medal of the Royal Society of Arts; Aspen Seven
- Projects: Open Architecture Network; Architecture for Humanity; Worldchanging Institute; Design Like You Give A Damn

Cameron Sinclair (born 16 November 1973) is a designer, writer and one of the pioneers in socially responsive architecture. He set up the Worldchanging Institute, a research institute focussing on innovative solutions to social and humanitarian crises and GM of Football for Life, a US/UK based organisation that designs and builds sports facilities in areas of conflict and crisis. In 2025, the launched Guns to Goals, focussed on smelting down decommissioned weapons into football goals. He is a third generation gin maker and is co-founder of Half Kingdom Gin based in Jerome, Arizona.

In 1999 he co-founded, with Kate Stohr, Architecture for Humanity, a charitable organisation that developed architectural solutions to humanitarian crises and brought professional design and construction services to communities in need. He left the company in 2013.

He was head of social innovation and helped to develop humanitarian programmes at Airbnb. Projects included emergency short term housing for those displaced by man-made and natural disasters; livelihoods for vulnerable communities; Community-led adventure travel and rural revitalisation.

In 2012 he set up Small Works, a for purpose design company which focusses on reconstruction and social impact projects. The organisation has designed self-built re-deployable structures, many of which were built as schools in Jordan by Syrian refugees and Jordanian engineers. Over 15,000 children have been educated in these facilities. Sinclair partnered with MADE Collective to propose the world's first co-nation called Otra Nation and BorderBNB, a home-share platform for families separated by political conflict and natural disasters.

== Education and personal life ==
Sinclair was born and grew up in South East London, England, and educated at Kingswood School, Bath. In the mid-1990s he trained as an architect at the University of Westminster and The Bartlett School of Architecture, University College London.

Having developed an interest in social, cultural and humanitarian design, his postgraduate thesis focussed on providing shelter to New York's homeless through sustainable, transitional housing. This thesis was the basis for starting Architecture for Humanity. Architecture for Humanity was co-founded by Sinclair in 1999 and grew to include 90,000 design professionals, 5 regional offices around the globe and 70 independent city-based chapters. In 2008, the University of Westminster awarded Sinclair an honorary doctorate for his services to the profession.

== Professional career ==
After graduating from university in 1997, Sinclair moved to New York City, where he worked as a designer for Steve Blatz Architects, Christidis Lauster Radu Architects and Gensler.

In 1999, Sinclair established Architecture for Humanity with Kate Stohr, a charitable organisation which developed architecture and design solutions to humanitarian crises, and provides pro bono design and construction services to communities in need. The organisation worked in forty eight countries on projects ranging from school, health clinics, affordable housing and long-term sustainable reconstruction. Work has also included rebuilding after the 2011 tsunami in Japan, 2010 earthquakes in Haiti, Hurricane Katrina and the 2004 South Asia tsunami.

In 2006, Sinclair and Stohr published a compendium on socially-conscious design, titled Design Like You Give A Damn: Architectural Responses to Humanitarian Crises (Metropolis Books). In 2012 they published a follow-up, titled Design Like You Give A Damn [2]: Building Change From The Ground Up (Abrams Books). Sinclair is a regular lecturer and visiting professor and has spoken at a number of international conferences on sustainable development and post disaster reconstruction. He has taught in New Zealand, Spain, Japan and the United States. He is visiting faculty at the International University of Catalonia and lectures on humanitarian design.

In May 2013, Sinclair stepped down from the board of Architecture for Humanity and in October 2013 resigned from the organisation. In 2015 the organisation ceased operation, before relaunching as the Open Architecture Collaborative.

From November 2013 to December 2015, Sinclair worked for a private family foundation on health, education, conservation projects in Cambodia, Ethiopia and Namibia. In autumn 2015 he began collaborating with Airbnb on rural revitalisation and community driven development in Yoshino, Japan. During this time Sinclair co-designed and collaborated on Re:build, the world's first re-deployable building system. 48 classrooms have been built by Syrian refugees in Jordan, providing access to education to over 11,000 children.

In 2016 Sinclair joined Airbnb to lead social innovation and supported the humanitarian efforts at the company with a goal to create temporary housing for 100,000 people over the next 5 years.

== Awards ==
In 2004, Fortune Magazine named Cameron Sinclair as one of the Aspen Seven, seven people changing the world for the better. He was the recipient of the 2006 TED Prize and the 2005 Rhode Island School of Design Emerging Designer of the Year. With co-founder Kate Stohr, he was awarded the Wired Magazine 2006 Rave Award for Architecture for their work in responding to housing needs following Hurricane Katrina.

As a result of the TED Prize he and Stohr launched the Open Architecture Network, the first open source community dedicated to improving living conditions through innovative and sustainable design. In 2012 the Open Architecture Network merged with Worldchanging to expand its work to both the built and natural environment.

In August 2008 Architecture for Humanity and its co-founders Sinclair and Stohr were named as recipients of the Design Patron Award for the 2008 National Design Awards. In 2008 he appeared as one of CNN's Principal Voices and in a television series, Iconoclasts, airing on the Sundance Channel.

In 2009 Sinclair and Stohr were awarded the Bicentenary Medal of the Royal Society of Arts for increasing people's resourcefulness. Sinclair was awarded the Pilosio Building Peace award in 2013 and as finalist of the World Design Impact Prize for 2016.

Sinclair was named a Young Global Leader by the World Economic Forum and Senior Fellow of the Design Futures Council.
