= Plazm (magazine) =

American visual arts magazine

Plazm magazine has been published since 1991 by a collective of designers, writers, and others in Portland, Oregon, United States. The complete catalog of Plazm magazine is included in the permanent collections of the San Francisco Museum of Modern Art, Princeton University, and the Denver Art Museum.

== Contributors ==
Notable designers who have been affiliated with Plazm include David Carson, Art Chantry, Milton Glaser, Rebeca Mendez, Reza Abedini, Modern Dog, Scott Clum, John C. Jay, Bruce Licher, Frank Kozik, Pablo Medina, The Attik, Why Not Associates, and Ed Fella.

Contributing artists have included Raymond Pettibon, Todd Haynes, Storm Tharp, Guillermo Gómez-Peña, Yoko Ono, Michael Brophy, Seripop, Rankin Renwick, Susan Seubert, and Terry Toedtemeier. Writers contributing to Plazm magazine include Julia Bryan-Wilson, Portland Monthly editor Randy Gragg, curator Stephanie Snyder, and Pere Ubu founder Dave Thomas, along with editors Jonathan Raymond and Tiffany Lee Brown.

The magazine has also run original pieces by interviewees, such as a handwritten fax-rant from Iggy Pop and faux McDonald's employment applications from Poison Ivy and Lux Interior of The Cramps.

== Brief history (magazine) ==
Founders of the magazine were Patrick Bardel, Joshua Berger, Karynn Fish, Neva Knott, Andrew McFarlane, Rueben Niesenfeld. Plazm magazine editors have been Neva Knott (issues 1-9), Yariv Rabinovitch (issues 10-17), and Jonathan Raymond (issues 18-28). In 2005, Tiffany Lee Brown joined Jon Raymond as co-editor of the magazine, and Sarah Gottesdiener became the magazine's editorial coordinator and frequent contributor. In 2010, New Oregon Arts and Letters, a nonprofit organization, became the magazine's publisher.

The magazine started as a large-format newsprint quarterly publication and is now a thick, perfect-bound, four-color, book-style magazine published annually. The magazine's blog was launched in 2008 on plazm.com; local Portland newspaper The Oregonian wrote, "We always take Plazm's recommendations seriously" and "These guys are among the most creative characters in the city, though, and we've already bookmarked them." However, the newspaper noted that the blog's "first few entries seemed a little heavy on 'great typefaces we've known and loved'."

Urban Honking referred to Plazm's "octopus identity" that has "spread tentacles into Portland's creative world and far beyond."

== Plazm design firm ==
Plazm Design was founded in 1995 by Joshua Berger, Pete McCracken and Niko Courtelis. The design firm has created brand identities, advertising, interactive and retail experiences, rich media content, video, broadcast commercials, editorial content, custom typography, books, and magazines.

Some designers who have worked for the firm have included Enrique Mosqueda, Jon Kieselhorst, Jon Steinhorst, Gus Nicklos, Carole Ambauen, Lotus Child, Ian Lynam, and Yoko Tsukahara. Plazm authored the book 'XXX: The Power of Sex in Contemporary Design' which won the Gold Medal at the Portland Design Festival "DNA-PDX."

Plazm was listed in 1997 in I.D. as one of the world's 40 most influential design firms and has been featured in numerous publications and award shows including the 100 show, AIGA, the professional association for design national show, the Art Director's Club, Eye, Communication Arts, Graphis, and IDEA (Japan). Plazm received the creative resistance award from Adbusters in 2001.

Clients of Plazm design have included Nike, LucasFilm, ESPN, Burgerville, The Cooley Gallery, Portland Center Stage, Jantzen Swimwear, and MTV.

== Plazmfonts ==
In 1993 Pete McCracken founded Plazmfonts in collaboration with the magazine. As Director of Plazmfonts division he led the creative efforts in designing the exclusive corporate typefaces for Nike, Adidas, and MTV. In 2006, McCracken left the magazine to create an independent branding, letter-founder, publisher, and typeface design studio called Plazmfonts.

== Nonprofit status ==
In 2010, the nonprofit organization New Oregon Arts & Letters became the publisher of Plazm magazine, winning a Regional Arts & Culture Council Opportunity Grant for printing costs of Plazm Issue #30, and an Oregon Cultural Trust grant to aid in developing a new website at plazm.org. In 2017, PICA, the Portland Institute for Contemporary Art, became Plazm magazine's new nonprofit fiscal sponsor.

== Plazm and social responsibility ==
Plazm publishes a statement of social responsibility and environmental sustainability. Co-founder and current principal Joshua Berger became known for his work in ecological concerns and recycling systems in the late 1980s and early 1990s, as noted by Oregon Business Journal and other magazines. The Feminist Review and Adbusters magazine have taken note of Plazm's work in social responsibility and gender equality; the former called the magazine "challenging and explicit."

Plazm nonprofit clients and collaborators receiving pro bono or discounted work for social, artistic, community, and environmental causes include the PICA (Portland Institute for Contemporary Art), ORLO, Pacific Northwest College of Art, New Oregon Arts & Letters, Northwest Film and Video Festival, Red Bull Theater, and KMHD radio. Plazm's Joshua Berger has shown political art in Times Square in the Urban Forest Project, The Organ Review of Art, UMASS, Mark Woolley Gallery, the Public Works series at Someday, and in 2GQ, a publication of 2 Gyrlz Performative Arts.
