= Jamais Cascio =

San Francisco Bay Area–based author and futurist

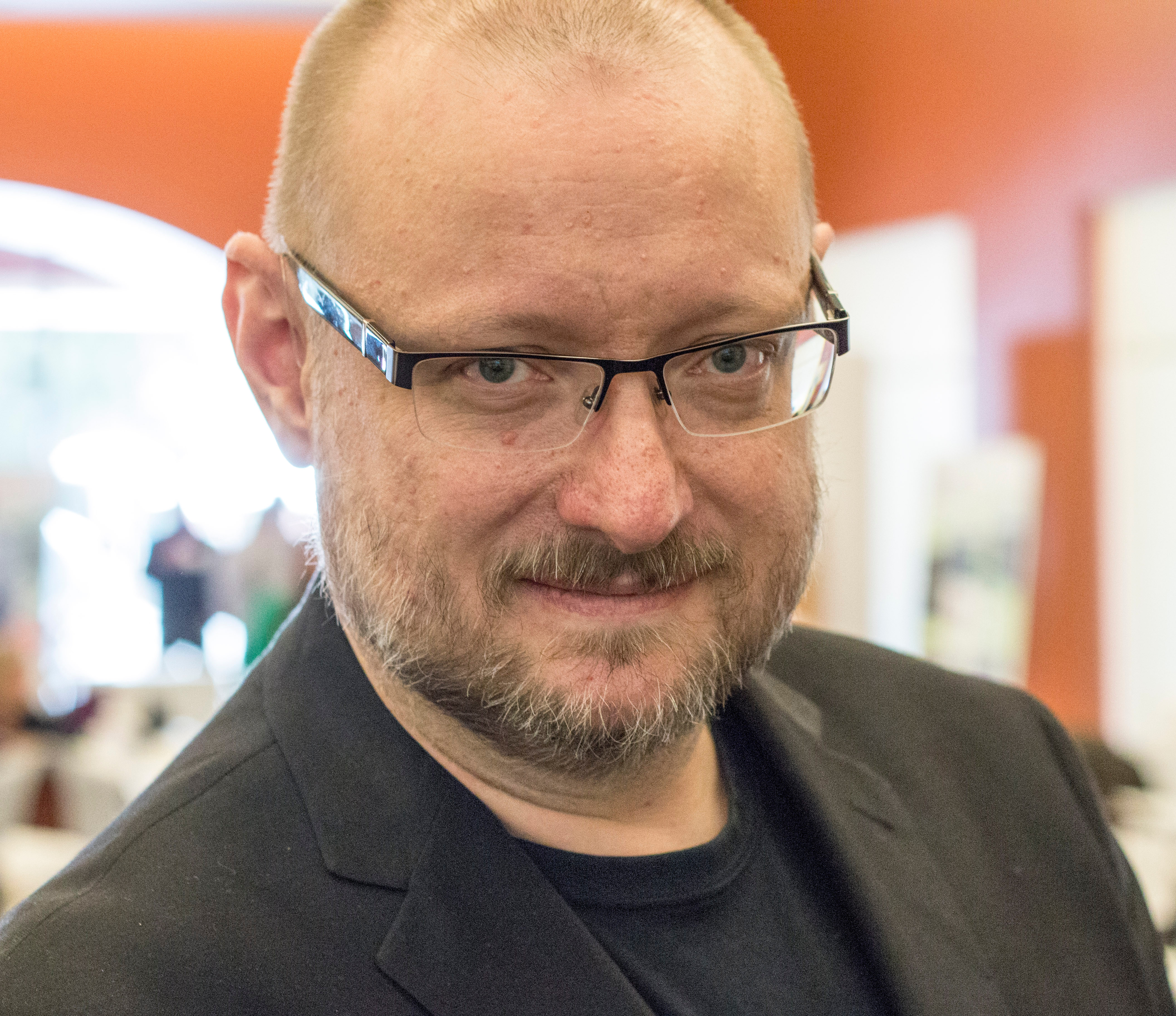
- Education: University of California, Santa Cruz
- Occupation: Futurist
- Writing career
- Period: 1983–1988
- Subjects: Anthropology, history
- Website: www.openthefuture.com

Jamais Cascio is a San Francisco Bay Area–based author and futurist.

== Early life and education ==
Cascio graduated from Mira Costa High School, Manhattan Beach, California, in 1983. In 1988, he graduated from the University of California, Santa Cruz, majoring in anthropology and history. He subsequently studied Political Science at University of California, Berkeley, graduating in 1993.

== Career ==
Cascio was Technology Manager at Global Business Network and Director of Impacts Analysis for the Center for Responsible Nanotechnology. In 1998, he served as technical advisor for the TV movie "Martian Law".

In 2009, Cascio was listed as one of Foreign Policy magazine's top 100 Global Thinkers. Michio Kaku has called him "a leading futurist with a long career of thoughtfully contemplating the outlines of tomorrow.". He has written articles for various publications on a variety of subjects, including the future of human evolution, education in the information age, and emergent technologies.

Cascio was made a Distinguished Fellow at the Institute for the Future in 2010, and continues to work with the organization. As of 2016 he was also a Senior Fellow at the Institute for Ethics and Emerging Technologies, and a member of the Ensia Advisory Council.

Cascio was awarded an Honorary Doctorate in recognition of his life's work by the University of Advancing Technology in May 2017.

== Projects ==
=== Transhuman Space ===
In the period 2003–04, Cascio published two volumes of background material for use in Steve Jackson Games' role playing game Transhuman Space, which is set in 2100.

Cascio's first volume, Broken Dreams, provides a political backdrop that concentrates on the less fortunate, and how they might respond to their circumstances.

The second volume, Toxic Memes, concentrates on the battle for public opinion, and the issues that might arise from a hypothetical new science of memetics: the analysis, engineering, and manipulation of ideas.

=== Worldchanging ===
In 2003, Cascio co-founded the online website Worldchanging with Alex Steffen. He contributed articles from 2003 until his departure in 2006. His range of topics covered energy, climate change, global development, open source, biotechnology, and nanotechnologies.

=== Cheeseburger carbon footprint ===
In 2006, when the concept of a carbon footprint was only just becoming an environmental talking point, Cascio decided to provide an illustrative example using a popular everyday item: the cheeseburger. Taking into account all factors that went into the manufacture and delivery of one cheeseburger, Cascio calculated that the equivalent of 3.6–6.1 kg (7.9–13.4 lb) of CO_{2} was generated. Interpreting the result another way, Cascio estimated the annual emissions from cheeseburger production and distribution in the United States was comparable to that of all SUVs being driven on American roads at the time.

The report raised a lot of interest, and featured in a segment of the National Geographic documentary Six Degrees Could Change the World.

=== Superstruct ===
In 2008 Cascio collaborated with Jane McGonigal as scenario designer and administrator for Superstruct; a large scale forecasting game at the Institute for the Future that invited players to use social media to describe how they would respond to five hypothetical but plausible threats to Humanity in the year 2019. The presentation followed the structure of the ten-year forecasting reports used by the Institute of The Future. 5000 players participated over a six-week period, starting in October 2008.

=== Geoengineering ===
Cascio has been a contributor to discussions about the ethics and practicality of geoengineering since 2005. In 2009, he self-published a collection of his essays under the title Hacking the Earth. These essays stress that geoengineering strategies do not address the underlying causes of global warming, and that the consequences need to be weighed carefully. Nevertheless, Cascio argues that geoengineering will likely be considered seriously as a way of keeping increases in global temperature to a minimum as global warming worsens. In 2010, he delivered a talk at the U.S. National Academies of Sciences entitled "Hacking the Earth (without voiding the warranty)."

In 2008–09, Cascio collaborated with the Australian Broadcasting Commission as a writer and consultant to produce Bluebird AR, an interactive multimedia drama that encouraged viewers to participate, and think about issues in geoengineering. The show was broadcast from April–June 2010.

=== Is Google making us stupid? ===
Is Google Making Us Stupid? was a 2008 article by Nicholas Carr, which was later expanded on in The Shallows. Carr suggested that the ready access to knowledge provided by internet search engines was affecting people's cognition skills; encouraging them to 'skim' information at the expense of critical thinking and focused research. Based on his personal experiences, Carr even wondered if the brain was being permanently affected.

Responding in the same publication a year later, Cascio argued that human cognition has always evolved to meet environmental challenges, and that those posed by the internet are no different: the "skimming" referred to by Carr was a form of attention deficit caused by the immaturity of filter algorithms. Cascio further argued that the problem will diminish as human needs exert evolutionary pressure of their own to cause the algorithms to improve.

The two articles have been used to promote topical debate in several places. Pew Research used them to form a tension-pair question survey that was distributed to noted academics. Most responded in detail; 76% agreeing with the proposition "Carr was wrong: Google does not make us stupid". When discussing the topic in The Googlisation of Everything, Siva Vaidhyanathan tended to side with Carr. However, he thought both arguments relied too much on determinism: Carr in thinking that an over-reliance on internet tools will inevitably cause the brain to atrophy, and Cascio in thinking that getting smarter is the necessary outcome of the evolutionary pressures he describes. John Naughton noted, in From Gutenberg to Zuckerberg, that many agreed Carr had hit on an important subject, but that his conclusions were not widely supported.

Cascio has since modified his stance, conceding that, while the internet remains good at illuminating knowledge, it is even better at manipulating emotion. "If Carr wrote his Atlantic essay now [2020] with the title 'Is Facebook Making Us Stupid?' it would be difficult to argue in favor of 'No.'"

=== BANI ===
In April, 2020, Cascio published the article "Facing the Age of Chaos" on Medium (website). In it, he proposed the "BANI" framework (Brittle, Anxious, Nonlinear, Incomprehensible) as a follow-on or replacement for the "VUCA" concept. BANI is meant to describe present-day and near-future conditions, focusing on perceived global chaos. BANI was soon in wide use by analysts and consultants, particularly in the Global South. Cascio has delivered multiple talks on BANI to audiences in Brazil, Sri Lanka, and elsewhere.

== Books ==
- Broken Dreams (Transhuman Space) (Steve Jackson Games, 2003).
- Toxic Memes (Transhuman Space) (Steve Jackson Games, 2004).
- Worldchanging: a User's Guide to the 21st Century (2006) (contributing author).
- Hacking the Earth: Understanding the Consequences of Geoengineering (self-published, 2009).

== Awards ==
- 2009 – Foreign Policy Magazine No. 72 among their "Top 100 Global Thinkers" for 2009.
- 2017 – Honorary Doctorate from the University of Advancing Technology.
