= Technogaianism =

Favor of technology to fight environmental threats

Technogaianism (a portmanteau word combining "techno-" for technology and "gaian" for Gaia philosophy) is a bright green environmentalist stance of active support for the research, development and use of emerging and future technologies to help restore Earth's environment. Technogaianists argue that developing safe, clean, alternative technology should be an important goal of environmentalists and environmentalism.

== Philosophy ==
Typically, radical environmentalists hold the view that all technology necessarily degrades the environment, and that environmental restoration can therefore occur only with reduced reliance on technology. By contrast, technogaianists argue that technology gets cleaner and more efficient with time, not necessarily progressing to the detriment of the environment. One example used is hydrogen fuel cells. More directly, they argue that such things as nanotechnology and biotechnology can directly reverse environmental degradation. Molecular nanotechnology, for example, could convert garbage in landfills into useful materials and products, while biotechnology could lead to novel microbes that devour hazardous waste.

While many environmentalists still contend that most technology is detrimental to the environment, technogaianists argue that it has been in humanity's best interests to exploit the environment mercilessly until fairly recently, following accurately to current understandings of evolutionary systems; when new factors (such as foreign species or mutant subspecies) are introduced into an ecosystem, they tend to maximize their own resource consumption until either, a) they reach an equilibrium beyond which they cannot continue unmitigated growth, or b) they become extinct. In these models, it is impossible for such a factor to totally destroy its host environment, though they may precipitate major ecological transformation before their ultimate eradication.

Technogaianists believe humanity has currently reached just such a threshold, and that the only way for human civilization to continue advancing is to accept the tenets of technogaianism and limit future exploitive exhaustion of natural resources and minimize further unsustainable development or face the widespread, ongoing mass extinction of species. The destructive effects of modern civilization are to be mitigated by technological solutions, such as using nuclear power. Furthermore, technogaianists argue that only science and technology can help humanity be aware of, and possibly develop counter-measures for, risks to civilization, humans and planet Earth such as a possible impact event.

Sociologist James Hughes mentions Walter Truett Anderson, author of To Govern Evolution: Further Adventures of the Political Animal, as an example of a technogaian political philosopher; argues that technogaianism applied to environmental management is found in the reconciliation ecology writings such as Michael Rosenzweig's Win-Win Ecology: How The Earth's Species Can Survive In The Midst of Human Enterprise; and considers Bruce Sterling's Viridian design movement to be an exemplary technogaian initiative.

The theories of English writer Fraser Clark may be broadly categorized as technogaian. Clark advocated "balancing the hippie right brain with the techno left brain". The idea of combining technology and ecology was extrapolated at length by a South African eco-anarchist project in the 1990s. The Kagenna Magazine project aimed to combine technology, art, and ecology in an emerging movement that could restore the balance between humans and nature.

George Dvorsky suggests the sentiment of technogaianism is to heal the Earth, use sustainable technology, and create ecologically diverse environments. Dvorsky argues that defensive counter measures could be designed to counter the harmful effects of asteroid impacts, earthquakes, and volcanic eruptions. Dvorksky also suggest that genetic engineering could be used to reduce the environmental impact humans have on the earth.

== Methods ==
=== Environmental monitoring ===
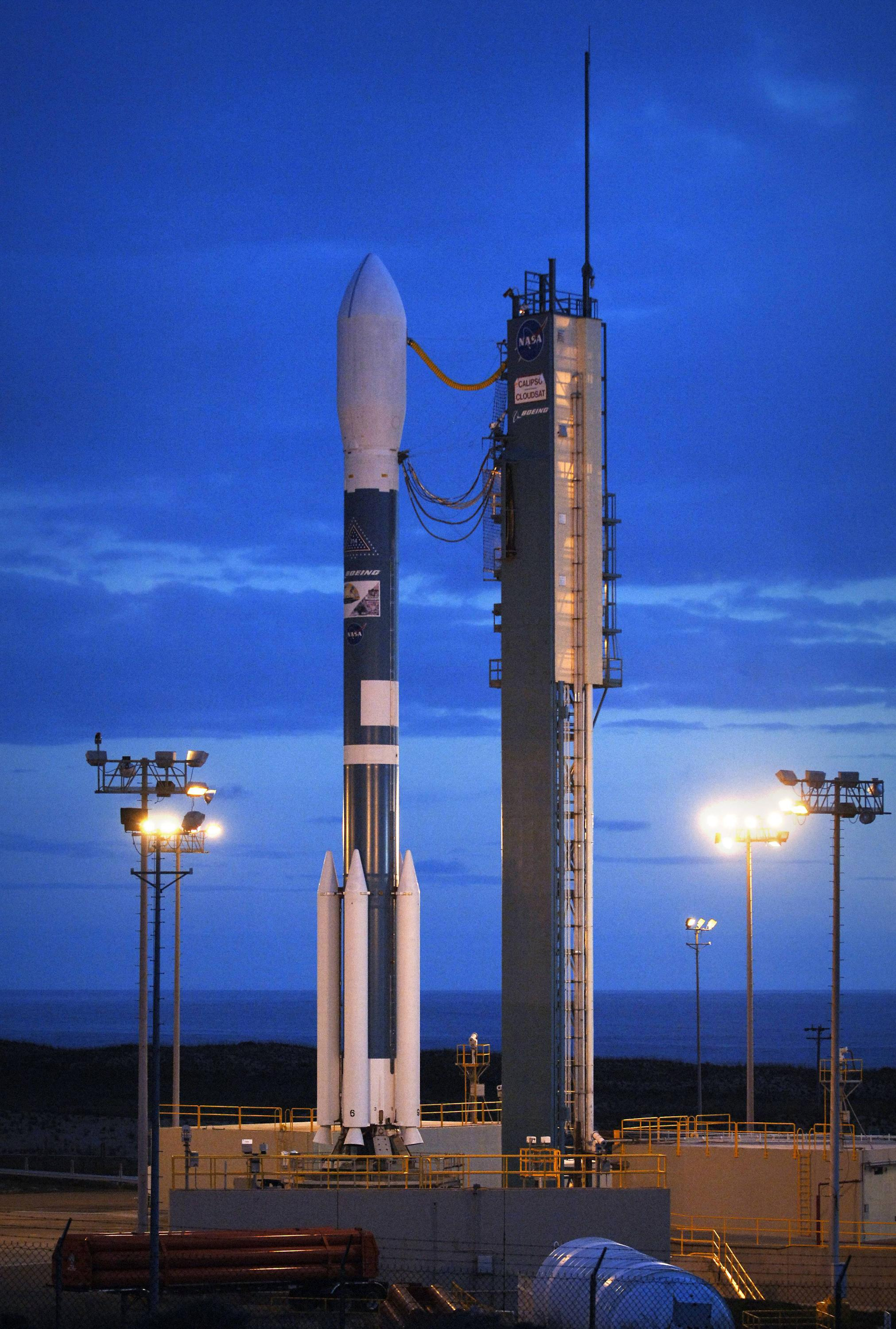
The Delta II rocket with climate research satellites, CloudSat and CALIPSO, on Launch Pad SLC-2W, VAFB

Technology facilities the sampling, testing, and monitoring of various environments and ecosystems. NASA uses space-based observations to conduct research on solar activity, sea level rise, the temperature of the atmosphere and the oceans, the state of the ozone layer, air pollution, and changes in sea ice and land ice.

=== Geoengineering ===
Climate engineering is a technogaian method that uses two categories of technologies- carbon dioxide removal and solar radiation management. Carbon dioxide removal addresses a cause of climate change by removing one of the greenhouse gases from the atmosphere. Solar radiation management attempts to offset the effects of greenhouse gases by causing the Earth to absorb less solar radiation.

Earthquake engineering is a technogaian method concerned with protecting society and the natural and man-made environment from earthquakes by limiting the seismic risk to acceptable levels. Another example of a technogaian practice is an artificial closed ecological system used to test if and how people could live and work in a closed biosphere, while carrying out scientific experiments. It is in some cases used to explore the possible use of closed biospheres in space colonization, and also allows the study and manipulation of a biosphere without harming Earth's. The most advanced technogaian proposal is the "terraforming" of a planet, moon, or other body by deliberately modifying its atmosphere, temperature, or ecology to be similar to those of Earth in order to make it habitable by humans.

=== Genetic engineering ===
S. Matthew Liao, professor of philosophy and bioethics at New York University, claims that the human impact on the environment could be reduced by genetically engineering humans to have, a smaller stature, an intolerance to eating meat, and an increased ability to see in the dark, thereby using less lighting. Liao argues that human engineering is less risky than geoengineering.

Genetically modified foods have reduced the amount of herbicide and insecticide needed for cultivation. The development of glyphosate-resistant (Roundup Ready) plants has changed the herbicide use profile away from more environmentally persistent herbicides with higher toxicity, such as atrazine, metribuzin and alachlor, and reduced the volume and danger of herbicide runoff.

An environmental benefit of Bt-cotton and maize is reduced use of chemical insecticides. A PG Economics study concluded that global pesticide use was reduced by 286,000 tons in 2006, decreasing the environmental impact of herbicides and pesticides by 15%. A survey of small Indian farms between 2002 and 2008 concluded that Bt cotton adoption had led to higher yields and lower pesticide use. Another study concluded insecticide use on cotton and corn during the years 1996 to 2005 fell by 35,600,000 kilograms (78,500,000 lb) of active ingredient, which is roughly equal to the annual amount applied in the EU. A Bt cotton study in six northern Chinese provinces from 1990 to 2010 concluded that it halved the use of pesticides and doubled the level of ladybirds, lacewings and spiders and extended environmental benefits to neighbouring crops of maize, peanuts and soybeans.

== Examples of implementation ==
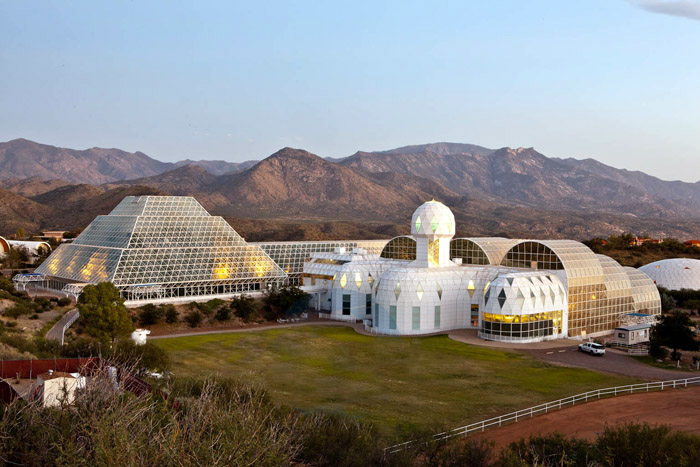
Biosphere 2 sits on a sprawling 40-acre (16-hectare) science campus that is open to the public.

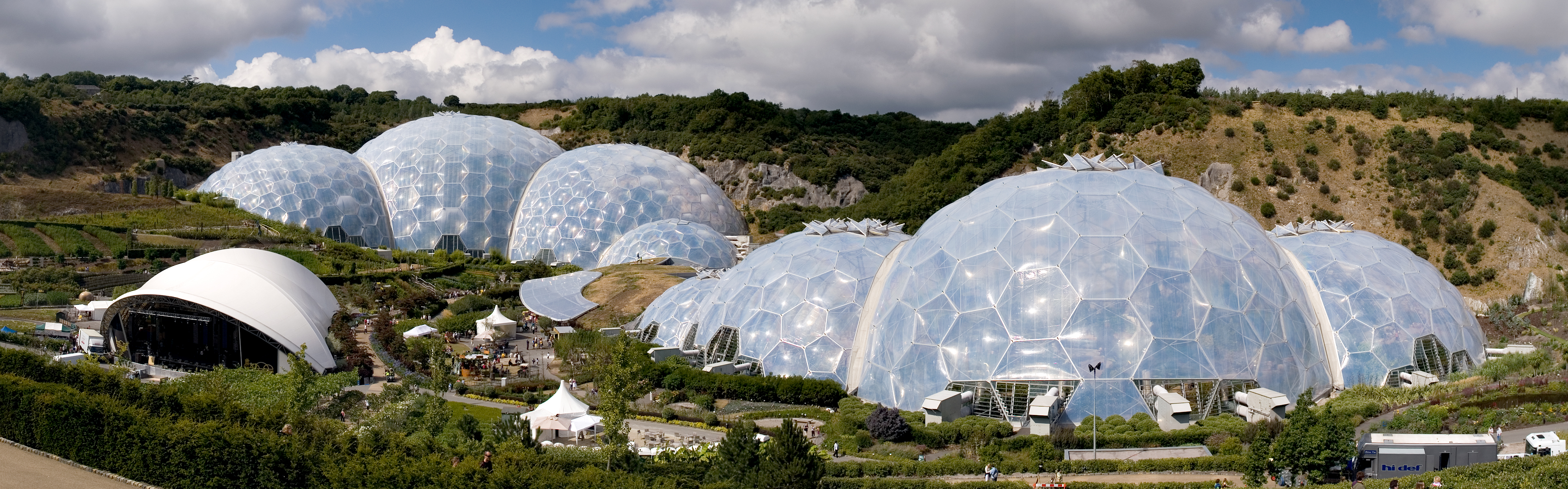
Panoramic view of the geodesic biome domes at the Eden Project

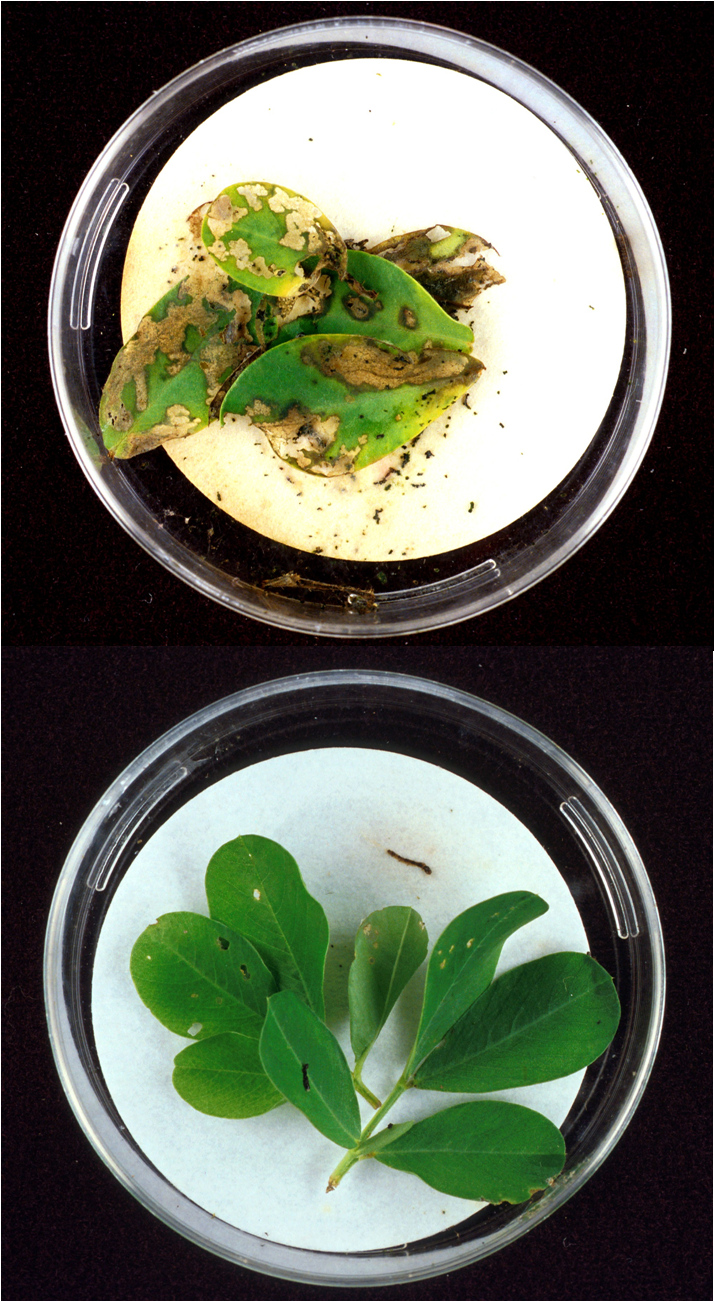
Bt toxins present in peanut leaves (bottom image) protect it from extensive damage caused by lesser cornstalk borer larvae (top image).

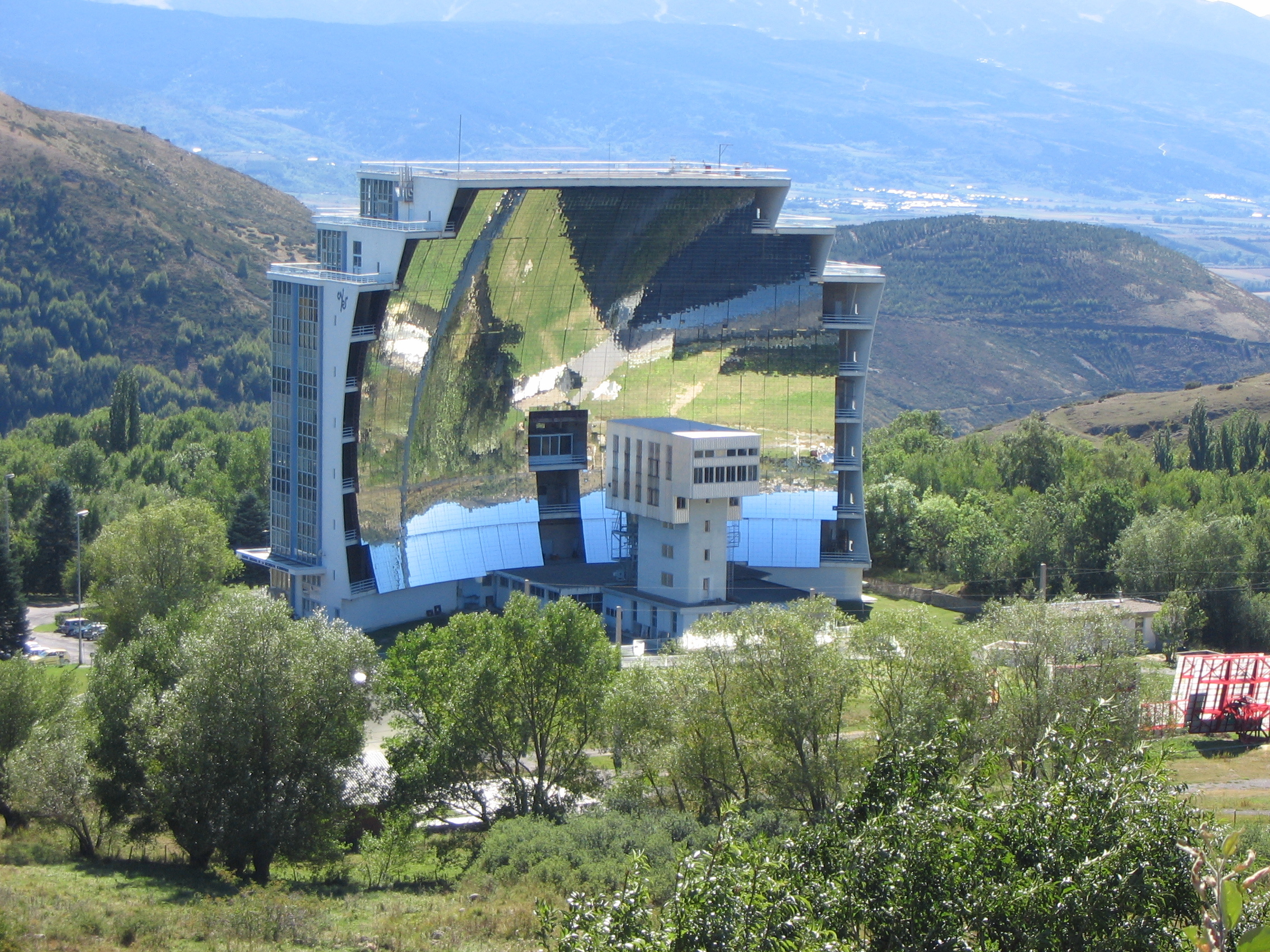
The solar furnace at Odeillo in the French Pyrenees-Orientales can reach temperatures up to 3,500°C.

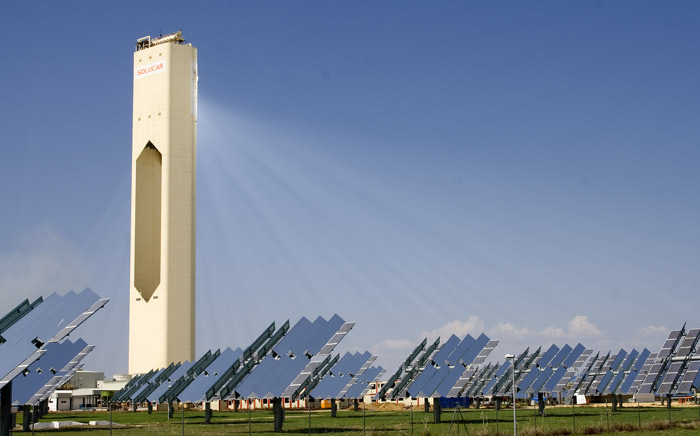
The PS10 Solar Power Plant concentrates sunlight from a field of heliostats onto a central solar power tower.

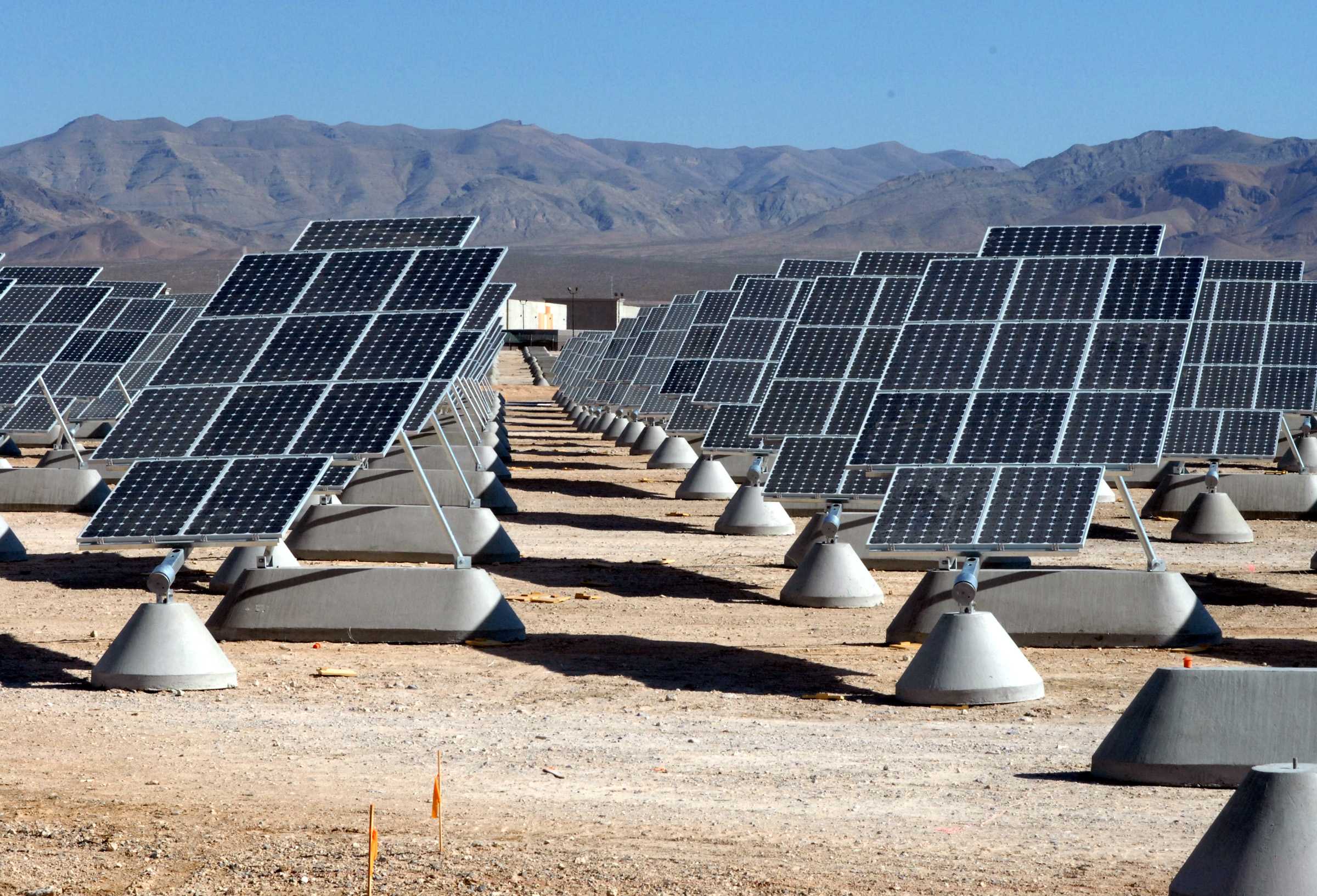
Nellis Solar Power Plant was the second largest photovoltaic power plant in North America when built.

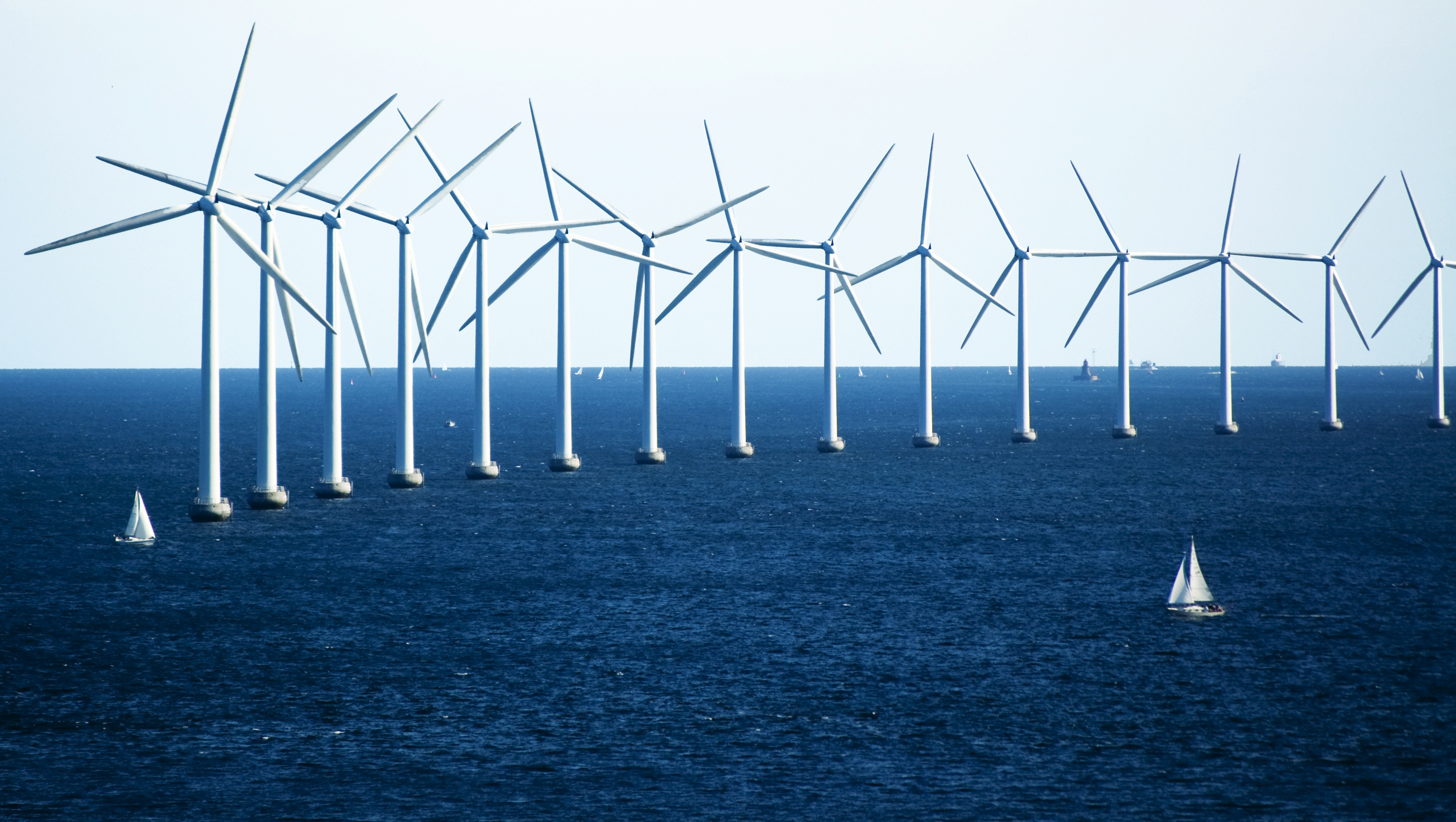
Offshore wind farm near Copenhagen, Denmark

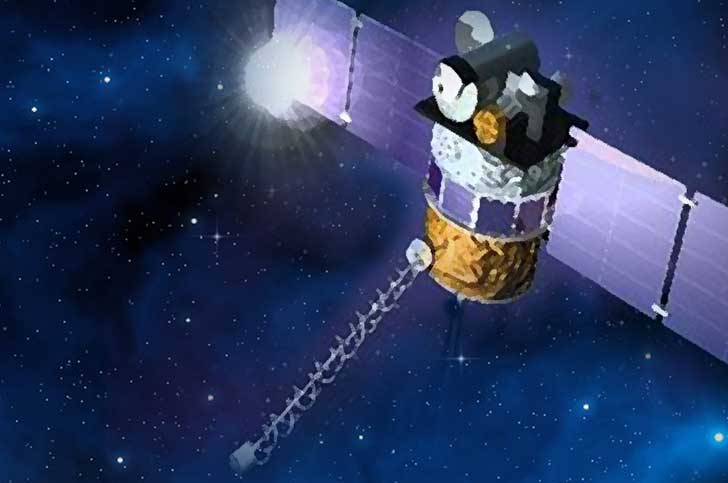
Deep Space Climate Observatory, designed to give an early warning of approaching solar storms

== Related environmental ethical schools and movements ==
- Biopunk/Do-it-yourself biology
- Solarpunk
- Bright green environmentalism
- Biomimetics
- Communalism
- Eco-communalism
- Prometheanism
- Reconciliation ecology
- Social ecology
- Viridian design movement
- The Zeitgeist Movement

== See also ==
- Frutiger Aero
- Post cyber punk
- Die Altneuland
- Appropriate technology
- Digital public goods
- Eco-innovation
- Ecological modernization
- Ecomodernism
- Ecosia
- Ecotechnology
- Environmental ethics
- Green development
- Green nanotechnology
- List of environmental issues
- Open-source appropriate technology
- Solarpunk
- Ten Technologies to Fix Energy and Climate
