= Worldchanging (book) =

2006 book by Alex Steffen

Worldchanging: A User's Guide for the 21st Century
- First edition
- Author: Alex Steffen (Editor)
- Illustrator: Sagmeister
- Language: English
- Genre: Green Guide
- Publisher: Harry N. Abrams, Inc.
- Publication date: November 1, 2006
- Publication place: United States
- Media type: Print (hardcover)
- Pages: 608 pp
- ISBN: 978-0-8109-3095-7

Worldchanging: A User's Guide for the 21st Century is a book about environmental concerns and practical actual responses. It is a compendium of the solutions, ideas and inventions emerging today for building a sustainable, livable, prosperous future. In November 2006, Worldchanging published a survey of global innovation, with a foreword by Al Gore, design by Stefan Sagmeister and an introduction by Bruce Sterling. It has received praise, was a winner of the 2007 "Green Prize" for sustainability literature, and is being translated into French under the title Change Le Monde, German and several other languages. Harry N. Abrams, Inc., the publisher of the hardcover edition, listed it among their 50 best selling titles in July 2008.

== Awards ==
The book was mentioned by BusinessWeek as one of the "Best Innovation and Design Books for 2006".

== Reprinting ==
The updated version was published April 1, 2011, called Worldchanging, Revised Edition: A User's Guide for the 21st Century ISBN 978-0-8109-9746-2. Alex Steffen is the author, Bill McKibben wrote the Introduction, and Van Jones wrote the Foreword. Sagmeister Inc. was the designer.

== See also ==
- Bright green environmentalism
- Worldchanging, the website on which the book is based
