= Iconoclasts (TV series) =

- Genre: Documentary
- Country of origin: United States
- No. of seasons: 6
- No. of episodes: 36

Production
- Running time: 60 minutes

Original release
- Network: Sundance Channel
- Release: November 17, 2005 – November 13, 2012

Iconoclasts is an American television documentary series that premiered on November 17, 2005 on Sundance Channel. Each episode pairs two "creative visionaries"— often in different fields — who discuss their lives, influences, and art. The series premiered on November 17, 2005 and last aired on November 13, 2012. The series consisted of six six-episode seasons.

== Episodes ==
=== Season 1 (2005) ===
No. overall	No. in series	Title	Original release date
1	1	Samuel L. Jackson and Bill Russell	November 17, 2005
2	2	Tom Ford and Jeff Koons	November 24, 2005
3	3	Brian Grazer and Sumner Redstone	December 1, 2005
4	4	Renée Zellweger and Christiane Amanpour	December 8, 2005
5	5	Mario Batali and Michael Stipe	December 12, 2005
6	6	Robert Redford and Paul Newman	December 29, 2005

=== Season 2 (2006) ===
No. overall	No. in series	Title	Original release date
7	1	Eddie Vedder and Laird Hamilton	October 26, 2006
8	2	Mikhail Baryshnikov and Alice Waters	November 2, 2006
9	3	Quentin Tarantino and Fiona Apple	November 9, 2006
10	4	Isabella Rossellini and Dean Kamen	November 16, 2006
11	5	Paul Simon and Lorne Michaels	November 23, 2006
12	6	Dave Chappelle and Maya Angelou	November 30, 2006

=== Season 3 (2007) ===
No. overall	No. in series	Title	Original release date
13	1	Sean Penn and Jon Krakauer	October 25, 2007
14	2	Alicia Keys and Ruby Dee	November 1, 2007
15	3	Mike Myers and Deepak Chopra	November 8, 2007
16	4	Howard Schultz and Norman Lear	November 15, 2007
17	5	Wynton Marsalis and John Besh	November 22, 2007
18	6	Madeleine Albright and Ashley Judd	November 29, 2007

=== Season 4 (2008) ===
No. overall	No. in series	Title	Original release date
19	1	Desmond Tutu and Sir Richard Branson	October 16, 2008
20	2	Stella McCartney and Edward Ruscha	October 23, 2008
21	3	Tony Hawk and Jon Favreau	October 30, 2008
22	4	Bill Maher and Clive Davis	November 6, 2008
23	5	Venus Williams and Wyclef Jean	November 13, 2008
24	6	Cameron Diaz and Cameron Sinclair	November 20, 2008

=== Season 5 (2010) ===
No. overall	No. in series	Title	Original release date
25	1	Charlize Theron and Jane Goodall	October 2, 2010
26	2	Lenny Kravitz and Lee Daniels	October 9, 2010
27	3	Hugh Jackman and Jean-Georges Vongerichten	October 16, 2010
28	4	Cate Blanchett and Tim Flannery	October 23, 2010
29	5	Ron Howard and Steve Nash	October 30, 2010
30	6	David Blaine and Chuck Close	November 6, 2010

=== Season 6 (2012) ===
No. overall	No. in series	Title	Original release date
31	1	James Franco and Marina Abramović	October 9, 2012
32	2	Judd Apatow and Lena Dunham	October 16, 2012
33	3	Seth MacFarlane and Norah Jones	October 23, 2012
34	4	Christy Turlington Burns and Tory Burch	October 30, 2012
35	5	Jamie Oliver and Paul Smith	November 6, 2012
36	6	Chuck D and Kareem Abdul-Jabbar	November 13, 2012

== Other ==
The show is very similar to Durch die Nacht mit … (German for "Into the night with..."), airing since 2002 on Franco-German television channel ARTE.

Iconoclasts has been parodied by Saturday Night Live (with Kristen Wiig as Björk and Kenan Thompson as Charles Barkley), MadTV, and American Dad! (with Katherine Helmond being paired with Usher, neither of whom know who the other one is).
