= Architecture for Humanity =

American charity (1999–2015)

- Type: Non-profit organization
- Industry: Architecture, International Development, Non Profit, Construction
- Founded: 1999
- Defunct: January 2015
- Headquarters: San Francisco, CA
- Key people: Cameron Sinclair and Kate Stohr, Co-Founders
- Revenue: $12,011,838 USD (2012/2013)
- Total assets: 4,258,238 United States dollar (2011)
- Number of employees: 65 (2012); 0 (2015)
- Website: architectureforhumanity.org (archived)

Architecture for Humanity was a US-based charitable organization that sought architectural solutions to humanitarian crises and brought professional design services to clients (often communities in need). Founded in 1999, it laid off its staff and closed down at the beginning of January 2015.

Since then, the 59 US-based architecture for humanity chapters (which were already operating more or less in a self-sufficient manner even before Architecture for Humanity closed down) formed the Open Architecture Collaborative and vowed to continue. It could thus be argued that despite the closing of the main office, the movement that Architecture for Humanity represented has indeed been strengthened, and not weakened, as it has forced the chapters to operate truly self-sufficiently, and cooperate more directly with the other chapters.

== History ==
Architecture for Humanity represents the finest of the new breed of architectural leadership, employing architectural skills and directing them for the larger good. - Editor in Chief of Architectural Record, Robert Ivy

The organization was founded on April 6, 1999, by Cameron Sinclair and Kate Stohr in response to the need for immediate long-term shelter for returning refugees in Kosovo after the region's bloody conflict. After hosting a series of open design competitions, the organization began taking on a number of build projects, pairing local communities with design professionals to develop a ground-up alternative to development and reconstruction.

In 2005 it adopted an "open source" model and became the first organization in the world to utilize Creative Commons licensing system on a physical structure. To date it has worked in 45 countries and over 2.8 million people now live, work, learn, gather and heal in 2,348 places helped by Architecture for Humanity design fellows, chapter members and volunteer design professionals.

In 2006 the organization published Design Like You Give A Damn: Architectural Responses to Humanitarian Crises, which chronicles its early history. The second volume, DLYGAD: Building Change from the Ground Up, was published in 2012.

In 2007, Architecture for Humanity launched Open Architecture Network, allowing architects, designers, innovators and community leaders to share innovative and sustainable ideas, designs and plans.

In 2010, Architecture for Humanity acquired Worldchanging.

Stohr departed the organization in May 2013 and Sinclair followed in October 2013;. Clark Manus was made interim Executive Director before being replaced by Sam Hartwell. In 2014 former studio director Eric Cesal became Executive Director.

The staff was laid off on January 1, 2015, and the organization's San Francisco office was closed down. Among the causes for its closure are its inability to raise adequate funds after the novelty of its mission was no longer appealing. Another factor cited is that humanitarian shelter design was not considered a fundamental human right.

After the bankruptcy of Architecture for Humanity in 2015, local chapters have formed a new organization: Open Architecture Collaborative.

In 2016, a lawsuit was filed in which the founders and board members of Architecture for Humanity were sued for $3 million for the alleged misuse of donations. The suit names 170 creditors who allege leadership used restricted monies for overhead and operational costs. In 2017, the suit was dismissed.

== Activity ==
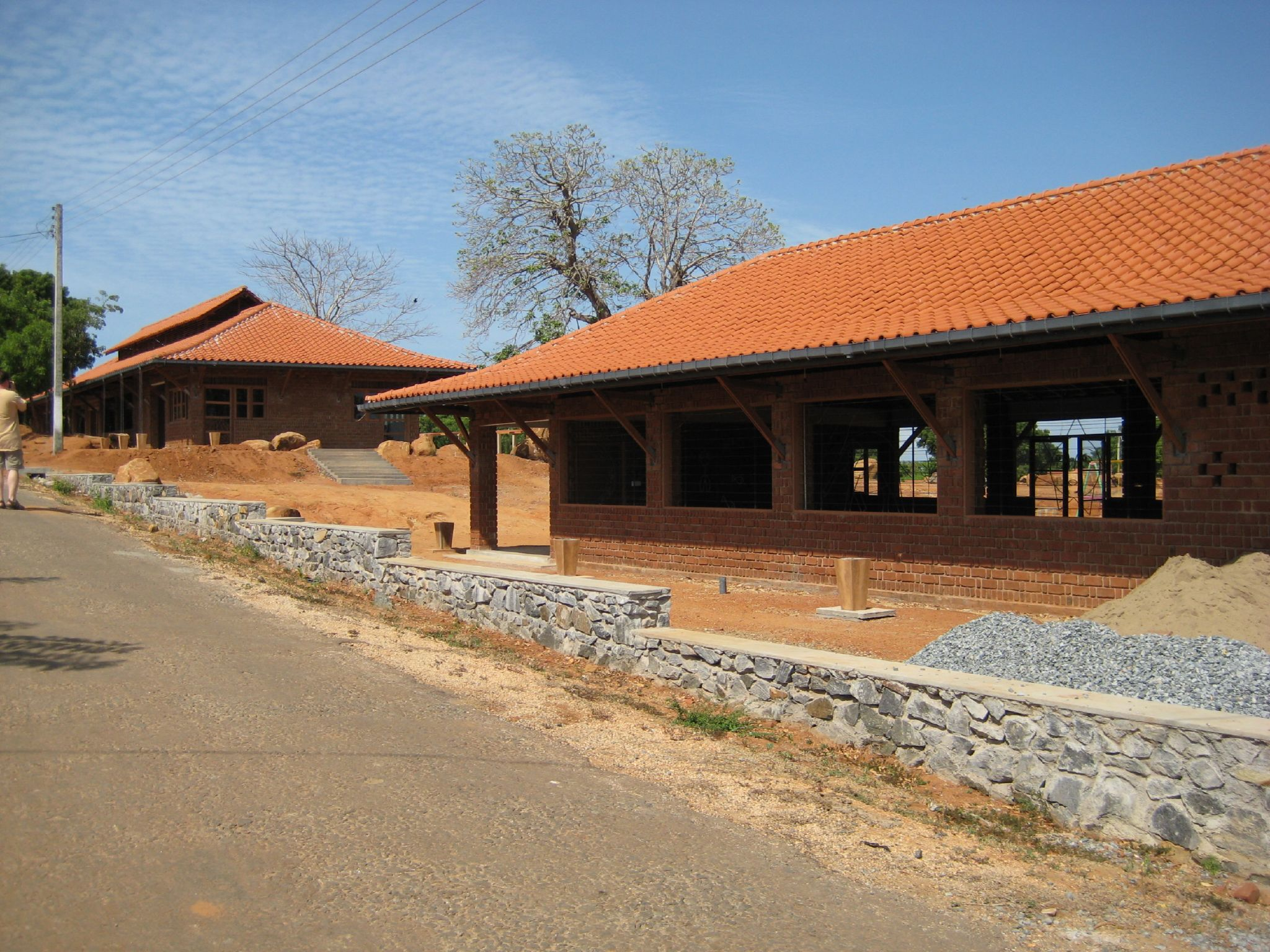
Yodakandiya Community Complex, Sri Lanka (2007) shortlisted for the 2010 Aga Khan Award for Architecture

=== Pro-bono design and construction ===
The organization provided pro-bono design and construction management services and funding for projects around the world, including developing and building schools in West Africa and Haiti, developing long-term rebuilding efforts in Myanmar after Cyclone Nargis, and constructing sports for social change facilities in Africa and South America. Work has also included long-term reconstruction in India and Sri Lanka following the Indian Ocean tsunami, rebuilding initiatives in the United States after Hurricane Katrina, and hosting a number of international design competitions.

Architecture for Humanity promoted humanitarian and social design through partnerships, advocacy and education based programs. To that end, they have consulted with government bodies and relief organizations on a number of projects, including landmine clearance programs and playground building in the Balkans; transitional housing for IDPs in Afghanistan, Sudan and Grenada; school building in Rwanda, Tanzania and Uganda; and earthquake reconstruction assistance in Pakistan, Turkey and Iran. The organization also sought to foster public appreciation for the many ways that architecture and design can improve lives.

=== Open Architecture Network ===
As a result of the TED Prize the organization worked with Sun Microsystems and Creative Commons to develop the Open Architecture Network, the first open source system for supporting sustainable and humanitarian design and architecture. This network includes project management, file sharing, a resource database and online collaborative design tools. A beta version of the site launched on March 8, 2007, at the 2007 TED Conference. It has garnered over 27,000 members and 5,000 projects. In late 2010 a version of the network was created as a mobile application that is showcased in the Museum of Modern Art.

== Organization ==
Architecture for Humanity had more than 60 chapters spanning many countries at its peak assisting many independent charities. The chapters worked primarily in their own regions. In August 2008, members of Architecture for Humanity New York were declared New Yorkers of the Week by cable news network NY1 for the chapter's first project.

After the main office and parent organization closed in January 2015, many of the chapters formed an alliance and vowed to persevere. 59 chapters joined this federation and continued to work on pro bono projects around the world. As of September 2015, there are still 57 active chapters listed on the alliance's website.

== Recognition ==
In 2005 Architecture for Humanity received the Index Award - Design to Improve Life (community category), in 2006 it was awarded the Rave Award for Architecture by Wired magazine and the Innovation of the Year as part of the Observer Newspapers' Ethical Awards, and in 2007 it won the Center for Architecture Foundation Award. In March 2006 its co-founder Cameron Sinclair was awarded the 2006 TED Prize, which awards its recipients "One wish to change the world".

In May 2008, the Cooper-Hewitt National Design Museum awarded Architecture for Humanity the Design Patron Award, highlighting its commitment to improving communities by providing pro bono, sustainable design services.

In June 2008 the organization was profiled on Frontline as part of their series of Stories From A Small Planet. That year co-founder Cameron Sinclair was profiled as one of CNN's Principal Voices and on the series Iconoclasts on the Sundance Channel.

== International design competitions ==
Architecture for Humanity has hosted a series of open international design competitions focused on systemic issues of poverty. These have included including Siyathemba youth sports and outreach facility; Outreach - Design Ideas for Mobile Health Clinic to Combat HIV/AIDS in Sub-Saharan Africa; and Transitional Housing for Kosovo's Returning Refugees.

In 2007 the organization began hosting its competitions on the Open Architecture Network and every two years hosted its premier design competition, The Open Architecture Challenge. The year of the inaugural competition, the AMD Open Architecture Challenge, sought ideas to develop innovative off the grid technology centers. Clients included a chocolate co-operative in Ecuador, a youth center in Kenya and a medical organization in Nepal. The competition culminated in the construction of a youth community and resource center in Nairobi, Kenya.

The 2009 Open Architecture Challenge was launched on January 29 at the World Economic Forum in Davos, Switzerland. With support of more than two dozen organizations it invited architects and designers to partner with schools to design cost effective and sustainable classrooms. An international jury convened in July at the 2009 Aspen Ideas festival and selected eight finalists from the tens of thousands of entries from more than 65 countries.
