= Open Architecture Network =

Defunct open source community

Open Architecture Network was the world's first online open source community dedicated to improving global living conditions through innovative and sustainable design. It was developed by Architecture for Humanity and incorporated Creative Commons licensing within the project management tools.

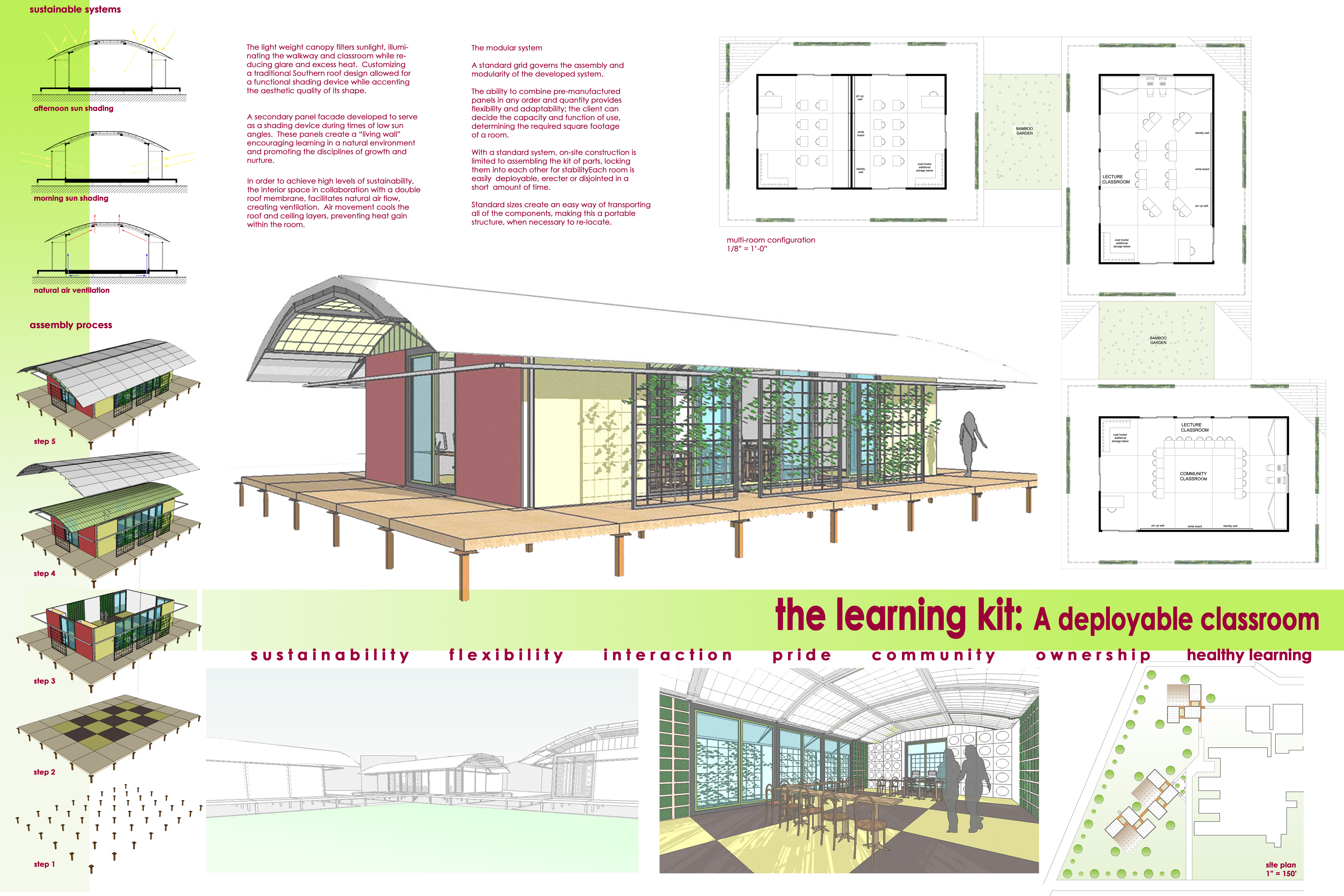
Sustainable portable classroom design proposal

== History ==
Open Architecture Network was formed after one of its founders, Cameron Sinclair, won the 2006 TED Prize from the Technology Entertainment Design conference. The prize awards each recipient 'one wish to change the world'.

The Beta Version launched at TED2007 on March 8, 2007. Shortly after the launch, AMD announced the sponsoring of the 2007 Open Architecture Challenge, an open design competition to develop technology facilities in the developing world.

== Purpose ==
The aim of the network is to allow architects, designers, innovators, and community leaders to share innovative and sustainable ideas, designs and plans. View and review designs posted by others. Collaborate with each other, people in other professions and community leaders to address specific design challenges. Manage design projects from concept to implementation. Protect their intellectual property rights using the Creative Commons "some rights reserved" licensing system and be shielded from unwarranted liability.

== See also ==
- Open source architecture
