= Bright green environmentalism =

Stance favoring the convergence of technological change with environmentalism

Bright green environmentalism is an environmental philosophy and movement that emphasizes the use of advanced technology, social innovation, eco-innovation, and sustainable design to address environmental challenges. This approach contrasts with more traditional forms of environmentalism that may advocate for reduced consumption or a return to simpler lifestyles.

Light green, and dark green environmentalism are yet other sub-movements, respectively distinguished by seeing environmentalism as a lifestyle choice (light greens), and promoting reduction in human numbers and/or a relinquishment of technology (dark greens).

== Origin and evolution of bright green thinking ==
The term bright green, coined in 2003 by writer Alex Steffen, refers to the fast-growing new wing of environmentalism, distinct from traditional forms. Bright green environmentalism aims to provide prosperity in an ecologically sustainable way through the use of new technologies and improved design.

Proponents promote and advocate for green energy, electric vehicles, efficient manufacturing systems, bio and nanotechnologies, ubiquitous computing, dense urban settlements, closed loop materials cycles and sustainable product designs. One-planet living is a commonly used phrase. Their principal focus is on the idea that through a combination of well-built communities, new technologies and sustainable living practices, the quality of life can actually be improved even while ecological footprints shrink.

Around the middle of the century we'll see global population peak at something like 9 billion people, all of whom will want to live with a reasonable amount of prosperity, and many of whom will want, at the very least, a European lifestyle. They will see escaping poverty as their nonnegotiable right, but to deliver that prosperity at our current levels of efficiency and resource use would destroy the planet many times over. We need to invent a new model of prosperity, one that lets billions have the comfort, security, and opportunities they want at the level of impact the planet can afford. We can't do that without embracing technology and better design.

The term bright green has been used with increased frequency due to the promulgation of these ideas through the Internet and coverage by some traditional media.

== Dark greens, light greens and bright greens ==
Alex Steffen describes contemporary environmentalists as being split into three groups, dark, light, and bright greens.

=== Light green ===
Light greens see protecting the environment first and foremost as a personal responsibility. They fall into the transformational activist end of the spectrum, but light greens do not emphasize environmentalism as a distinct political ideology, or even seek fundamental political reform. Instead, they often focus on environmentalism as a lifestyle choice. The motto "Green is the new black" sums up this way of thinking, for many. This is different from the term lite green, which some environmentalists use to describe products or practices they believe are greenwashing, those products and practices which pretend to achieve more change than they actually do (if any).

=== Dark green ===
In contrast, dark greens believe that environmental problems are an inherent part of industrialized, capitalist civilization, and seek radical political and social and cultural change. Dark greens believe that currently and historically dominant modes of societal organization inevitably lead to consumerism, overconsumption, overproduction, waste, alienation from nature and resource depletion. Dark greens claim this is caused by the emphasis on economic growth that exists within all existing ideologies, a tendency sometimes referred to as growth mania. The dark green brand of environmentalism is associated with ideas of ecocentrism, deep ecology, degrowth, anti-consumerism, post-materialism, holism, the Gaia hypothesis of James Lovelock, and sometimes a support for a reduction in human numbers and/or a relinquishment of technology to reduce humanity's effect on the biosphere.

Dark greens may point to effects like the Jevons paradox to argue limits to the benefits of technological approaches such as advocated by bright greens.

=== Contrast between light green and dark green ===
In The Song of the Earth, Jonathan Bate notes that there are typically significant divisions within environmental theory. He identifies one group as “light Greens” or “environmentalists,” who view environmental protection primarily as a personal responsibility. The other group, termed “dark Greens” or “deep ecologists,” believes that environmental issues are fundamentally tied to industrialized civilization and advocate for radical political changes. This distinction can be summarized as “Know Technology” versus “No Technology” (Suresh Frederick in Ecocriticism: Paradigms and Praxis).

=== Bright green ===
More recently, bright greens emerged as a group of environmentalists who believe that radical changes are needed in the economic and political operation of society in order to make it sustainable, but that better designs, new technologies and more widely distributed social innovations are the means to make those changes—and that society can neither stop nor protest its way to sustainability. As Ross Robertson writes,

[B]right green environmentalism is less about the problems and limitations we need to overcome than the "tools, models, and ideas" that already exist for overcoming them. It forgoes the bleakness of protest and dissent for the energizing confidence of constructive solutions.

Some have included open source technology as part of this new approach.

== See also ==
- Biomimicry – Imitation of biological systems for the solving of human problems
- Eco-innovation – Development of products and processes that contribute to sustainable development
- Ecological modernization – Environmental theory linking economic growth with sustainable technological solutions
- Ecomodernists – Environmental movement emphasizing technological innovation for sustainability
- Ecosia – Web search engine and browser
- Efficient energy use – Methods for higher energy efficiency
- Environmental technology – Technical and technological processes for protection of the environment
- Hydrogen economy – Using hydrogen to decarbonize more sectors
- Post-scarcity economy – Situation in which most goods are available to everyone at little or no cost
- Prometheanism – Philosophy advocating human progress through technology and mastery over nature
- Renewable energy commercialization – Deployment of technologies harnessing easily replenished natural resources
- Solarpunk – Literary, political and artistic movement
- Technogaianism – Favor of technology to fight environmental threats
- Viridian design movement – Aesthetic facet of bright green environmentalism
- Whole Earth Discipline – 2009 book by Stewart Brand
- Worldchanging
