= Viridian design movement =

Aesthetic facet of bright green environmentalism

The Viridian Design Movement was an aesthetic movement focused on concepts from bright green environmentalism. The name was chosen to refer to a shade of green that does not quite look natural, indicating that the movement was about innovative design and technology, in contrast with the "leaf green" of traditional environmentalism. The movement tied together environmental design, techno-progressivism, and global citizenship. It was founded in 1998 by Bruce Sterling, a postcyberpunk science fiction author. Sterling always remained the central figure in the movement, with Alex Steffen perhaps the next best-known. Steffen, Jamais Cascio, and Jon Lebkowsky, along with some other frequent contributors to Sterling's Viridian notes, formed the Worldchanging blog. Sterling wrote the introduction to Worldchanging's book (Worldchanging: A Users Guide for the 21st Century), which (according to Ross Robertson) is considered the definitive volume on bright green thinking. Sterling formally closed the Viridian movement in 2008, saying there was no need to continue its work now that bright green environmentalism had emerged.
