= Tiffany Lee Brown =

American writer and artist

Tiffany Lee Brown is an American writer and artist. She is from Oregon, currently living and working in Central Oregon. For many years she was known for her work in Portland.

Author of A Compendium of Miniatures (Tiger Food Press, 2007), Brown is an editor at PLAZM magazine. She writes for the Nugget Newspaper in Sisters, Oregon, which publishes her column "In the Pines". She also edits the newspaper's section for younger readers, writers, and artists, "Kids in Print". Brown is a partner in Kid Made Camp, which educates youth in hands-on creativity, journalism, and ethical business practices.

She was formerly an editor at 2GQ (2 Gyrlz Quarterly), Anodyne magazine, Signum Press, and FringeWare Review. Her writing has appeared in Utne, Tin House, Oregon Humanities, Wired, Bust, and Bookforum.

She pseudonymously co-founded the dUdU art collective. In the 2000s Brown was associated with art movements described as social practice, participatory art, social-relational, and personal-emotional participatory.

Her performances and interdisciplinary pieces have been presented by Portland Center Stage's JAW Festival, Performance Arts NorthWest, the Enteractive Language Festival, Portland Institute for Contemporary Art's Dada Ball, the Portland Rose Festival, and the Dark Arts Festival. In the early 1990s, Brown was on the staff of The WELL in Sausalito, California.

Her largest interdisciplinary work is "The Easter Island Project," encompassing participatory art, installation art, video, writing, musical composition, and performance, created and presented throughout 2007–2013.

The Easter Island Project's "art gatherings", installations, and performances occurred at venues in New York, Seattle, Portland, Oakland, Prescott, Arizona, and in several Pacific Northwest locations. Inara Verzemnieks wrote in The Oregonian: "As an artist, she had always sought to be fearless, to tackle difficult subjects, to provoke discussion. 'With Tiffany, things are not theoretical," says Stephanie Snyder, curator and director of the Douglas F. Cooley Memorial Art Gallery at Reed College. 'With her, it's always about the lived issues.'"

Brown has been affiliated with the dUdU art collective since the early 1990s. She chaired the board of directors for the non-profit organization 2 Gyrlz Performative Arts, and Director of the non-profit New Oregon Arts+ Letters since 2009.
