= Susan Seubert =

American photographer

- Born: 1970 (age 55–56); Indianapolis, Indiana
- Education: B.F.A., Pacific Northwest College of Art
- Known for: Fine-art photography, photojournalism, editorial photography, National Geographic Travel Magazine
- Website: www.seubertfineart.com

Susan Seubert (born 1970) is an American fine art and editorial photographer based in Portland, Oregon and Maui, Hawaii. She has exhibited internationally, photographing subjects from Canada to Thailand.

== Early life and education ==
Seubert was born in 1970 in Indianapolis, Indiana, the daughter of a nuclear physicist and a Russian scholar and attorney.

Seubert earned a B.F.A. at Pacific Northwest College of Art in 1992.

== Career ==
...photography is a form of visual communication — sometimes it's didactic and sometimes it's more conceptual. It's like having a toolbox — a hammer is good for one thing and a screwdriver another… an ambrotype is good for a certain kind of visual communication whereas a digital file is good for another.

— Susan Seubert

Seubert's first assignment for Newsweek was related to the 1994 Tonya Harding story. Since that time, according to Ifanie Bell, "The Portland-based photographer still makes her living taking pictures, but she has turned her lenses toward capturing stunning shots of landscapes, life and leisure."

In 2011 the Oregon Arts Commission said, "Seubert’s photography has been exhibited throughout the United States and abroad, including the 2005 Northwest Biennial, Tacoma Art Museum; Museum of Fine Arts, Houston, 2004; and the Portland Art Museum’s 1999 and 2001 Oregon Biennial. In 2001, Seubert was a finalist for the prestigious Betty Bowen Award at the Seattle Art Museum."

== Critical reception ==
National Geographic Travel Expeditions said Seubert's photography represents "a variety of subjects and... a sense of place through her wide-ranging imagery. Susan's in-depth knowledge of digital technologies and her multimedia skills keep her at the cutting edge of visual storytelling."

Ken Johnson of the New York Times wrote, "Elegant emblematic photographs by Susan Seubert symbolizing various phobias address danger only from an indirect, dryly philosophical distance."

Bob Hicks of Oregon Arts Watch wrote of her exhibit "Not a Day Goes By",

Seubert’s exhibit on a subject most people don’t like to think about includes two series... depicting various methods of taking one’s own life. They are passionate and controlled and free of irony. The larger images in particular are unsettling and revealing. These ghostly images of faces misshapen by clinging bags of clear plastic are confrontational, and yet they’re not. The photographs are beautiful, simple, gorgeous in a way that seems strangely moving and serene, like Pietàs of the underworld.

— Bob Hicks

== Selected solo exhibitions ==
- 2025 Fragile Beauty, PDX Contemporary Art, Portland, Oregon
- 2019 A Typology of Lament, Froelick Gallery, Portland, Oregon
- 2017 Not A Day Goes By, Froelick Gallery, Portland, Oregon
- 2015 The Fallacy of Hindsight, Froelick Gallery, Portland, Oregon
- 2015 100 Memories, G. Gibson Gallery, Seattle
- 2013 Susan Seubert, Fairbanks Gallery, Oregon State University, Oregon
- 2012 Nerve-Wracked, Kittredge Gallery, Univ. Puget Sound, Tacoma, curated by Margaret Bullock
- 2011 Restraint, Froelick Gallery, Portland, Oregon
- 2009 Science | Fiction, Froelick Gallery, Portland, Oregon
- 2006 Flowers and Phobias, J Crist Gallery, Boise, Idaho
- 2005 Memento Mori, Froelick Gallery, Portland, Oregon
- 2005 100 Cheerleaders, Sheehan Gallery, Whitman College, Walla Walla
- 2005 Memento Mori and Other Tintypes, G. Gibson Gallery, Seattle
- 2003 Neurasthenia, Froelick Gallery, Portland, Oregon
- 2003 Bella Madrona, University of Portland—Buckley Center Gallery, Portland
- 2002 Chimeras, in conjunction with FotoFest 2002, Mixture Contemporary Art, Houston (catalogue)
- 2000 Chimeras, Froelick Adelhart Gallery, Portland, Oregon
- 1998 The Ten Most Popular Places to Dump a Body in the Columbia River Gorge, Froelick Adelhart Gallery, Portland, Oregon
- 1997 Panphobia, Houston Center For Photography, Gallery X, Houston
- 1996 Panphobia, Froelick Adelhart Gallery, Portland, Oregon
- 1996 Violence Objects: YWCA Week Without Violence, Pioneer Place Atrium, Portland, Oregon
- 1993 Every Three Seconds, Jamison Thomas Gallery, Portland

== Selected awards ==
- 2014 Category 176–Gold, Photography: Photo Essay, Discovering Old Bangkok, North American Travel Journalists Association
- 2014 National Geographic Traveler Gold Award for Photo Essay, "Saving Old Bangkok"
- 2011 National Geographic Traveler Bronze Award for Portrait, People, "It's a Wonderful Life"
- 2011 Oregon Arts Commission Award for the Ford Family Foundation Art Acquisition Grant Awards
- 2010 Overall Excellence in Photography, North American Travel Journalists Association
- 2009 National Geographic Traveler Award of Merit for Photography, Overall Excellence
- 1999 Alfred Eisenstaedt Award, Columbia University

== See also ==
- Photojournalism
- Fine-art photography
