= Duncan Oppenheim =

British businessman (1904–2003)

Sir Duncan Oppenheim (6 August 1904 St Helens, Lancashire - January 2003 London) was chairman of British American Tobacco (1953–1966), the Council of Industrial Design (1960–1972) and of Chatham House (1966–1971). In 1955 and 1968 he participated in the conference of the Bilderberg Group. He was also a noted arts administrator.
