= Robby Garner =

American natural language programmer and software developer

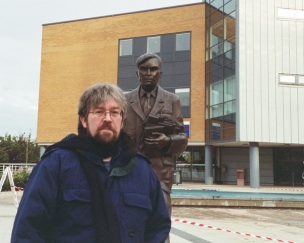
- Robby Garner, c. 2005
- Born: 1963 (age 62–63); Cedartown, Georgia, U.S.
- Occupations: Natural language programmer, software developer
- Organizations: Robitron Software Research, Inc.
- Known for: Loebner Prize winner (1998, 1999), "most human" computer program (2001 Guinness Book of World Records)
- Notable work: Albert One, Max Headcold, JFRED
- Awards: Loebner Prize (1998, 1999)

Robby Garner (born 1963) is an American natural language programmer and software developer. He won the 1998 and 1999 Loebner Prize contests with the program called Albert One. He is listed in the 2001 Guinness Book of World Records as having written the "most human" computer program.

== Life ==
A native of Cedartown, Georgia, Robby attended Cedartown High School. He worked in his father's television repair shop and began programming for his family's business at age 15. He was commander of his AFJROTC squadron as a junior in high school, while attending joint-enrollment college classes at the local community college. Forming a software company called Robitron Software Research, Inc. in 1987 with his father, Robert J. Garner, and his sister Pam, he worked as a software developer until 1997 when he moved to Cedartown. He established his NLP work at this point, and has continued to work with that kind of skillset for narrative story telling and interactive communications.

== Early conversational systems ==
One of the first web chatterbots, named Max Headcold, was written by Garner in 1995. Max served two purposes, to collect data about web chat behavior and to entertain customers of the FringeWare online bookstore. This program was eventually implemented as a Java package called JFRED, written by Paco Nathan based on the C++ FRED CGI program, and his own influences from Stanford and various corporations. Garner and Nathan took part in the world's largest online Turing test in 1998. Their JFRED program was perceived as human by 17% of the participants.

== Philosophy and collaborations ==
A computational behaviorist after the term coined by Dr. Thomas Whalen in 1995, Garner's first attempts at simulating conversation involved collections of internet chat viewed as a sequence of stimuli and responses. Kevin Copple of Ellaz Systems has collaborated with Garner on several projects, including Copple's Ella, for which, Garner contributed voice recordings and music. Garner and Copple believe that intelligence may be built one facet at a time, rather than depending on some general purpose theory to emerge.

== Loebner Prize contest ==
Competing in six Loebner Prize contests, he used the competition as a way to test his prototypes on the judges each year. After winning the contest twice in 1998 and 1999 with his program called Albert One, he began collaborating with other software developers in a variety of conversational systems. Garner created the Robitron Yahoo Group in 2002 as a forum and virtual watering hole for Loebner Prize contest participants and discussion of related topics.

== Current works ==
After winning the contest twice, Garner went on to create chatbots for the BBC's show Tomorrow's World, and Megalab for the world's largest Turing test. Viewers of the show rated one bot as 17% human. The multifaceted approach, presented at a colloquium on conversational systems in November 2005, involves multiple chat bots working under the control of a master control program. Using this technique, the strengths of various web agents may be united under the control of a Java applet or servlet. The control program categorizes stimuli and delegates responses to other programs in a hierarchy. A spin-off of this technique is the Turing Hub,

Garner's current work ( 2009, 2010, 2014) focuses on text-only communications and the use of film theory to facilitate story telling, and identification of emotions in human beings. By reducing extraneous channels of information, in text there is enough information to build an empirical measure of semantic fidelity in human-computer communications.

== See also ==
- Rollo Carpenter – British artificial intelligence researcher
- Richard Wallace – American computer programmer
