= Alex Steffen =

American journalist and futurist

Alex Steffen (born c. 1968 in Oakland, California) is an American futurist and advocate of 'bright green environmentalism' who writes and speaks about sustainability and the future of the planet.

== Biography ==
From 2003 to 2010, Steffen was executive editor at the website Worldchanging. Worldchanging practiced "solutions-based journalism". The non-profit organization announced that the goal of its work was to highlight new solutions to what the editorial team saw as the planet's most pressing problems, rather than to spread news of those problems or critiques of their causes.

The site won or was nominated for a number of awards and prizes, including winning the Utne Independent Press Award (2005), finalist for a Webby for Best Blog (2006), finalist for a Webby for Best Magazine and Bloggie awards for Best Group Weblog and Best Writing for a Weblog (2007), won the Green Prize for Sustainable Literature for its book, won Organic Design Award, Prix Ars Electronica nominee, and in 2008 was named a Webby Official Honoree.

In November 2006, Steffen published a survey of global innovation, Worldchanging: A User's Guide for the 21st century (ISBN 978-0810930957), with a foreword by Al Gore, design by Stefan Sagmeister and with an introduction by Bruce Sterling. A new, updated edition, with a foreword by Van Jones and an introduction by Bill McKibben, was published in 2011.

In 2012, Steffen released Carbon Zero: Imagining Cities That Can Save the Planet, a book which explored the innovations and policy changes that a North American city would need to make to become carbon neutral.

In 2013, he became "Planetary Futurist in Residence" at the design company IDEO.

In 2016, Steffen successfully ran a crowd-funding campaign for The Heroic Future, a three-part series of documentaries on how we might imagine a sustainable future. The theme was "you cannot build what you cannot imagine". The series was filmed in front of a live audience over three nights in September 2016 at the Marines' Memorial Theatre in San Francisco.

In 2017, following the election of President Donald Trump, Steffen modified his style to a form of "anticipatory journalism", taking the same themes as The Heroic Future and setting them in the near future, post-Trump. This series of newsletters are titled The Nearly Now.

In 2022, the New York Times Magazine discussed Steffen's work in a cover story about climate change and California's future. In 2026, Steffen's workshops on what he calls "personal climate strategy" were covered in the New York Times, as "part of a growing cottage industry catering to fears about climate change and societal breakdown."

== Public speaking ==
Steffen is a frequent public speaker and has spoken at TED, Poptech, Design Indaba, Amsterdam's PicNic, The Royal Geographical Society and New Delhi's Doors of Perception. As well as keynote addresses at industry events like the AIGA and IDSA national conferences, O'Reilly's Emerging Technologies (eTech), FOO Camp and the Business Expo Bright Green held during the Copenhagen Climate Summit. Steffen has given keynote speeches at three different South by Southwest conferences (SxSW). He has also spoken at universities including Harvard, Yale, Oxford, Stanford and the London School of Economics.

== See also ==
- Worldchanging
- Viridian design movement
- Bright green environmentalism
