= Prometheanism =

Philosophy advocating human progress through technology and mastery over nature

Prometheanism is an environmentalist term popularized by the political theorist John Dryzek to describe a perspective which perceives the Earth as a resource whose utility is determined primarily by human needs and interests and whose environmental problems are overcome through human innovation. The term was introduced in Dryzek's work, The Politics of the Earth: Environmental Discourses (1997). In contrast with other environmental perspectives, Prometheanism prioritizes human interests and needs over those of ecosystems (as with deep ecology) or the individual needs of creatures (as in eco-feminism).

In his 1992 book Green Delusions: An Environmentalist Critique of Radical Environmentalism, Martin Lewis offered one of the first systematic comparisons of how Promethean environmentalism differs from traditional Arcadian forms of environmentalism such as deep ecology.

== See also ==
- Bright green environmentalism
- Technogaianism
