= Worldchanging =

- Type: Nonprofit Organization
- Industry: Environmental and social reporting
- Founded: 2003
- Founders: Alex Steffen, and Jamais Cascio
- Fate: Dissolved in 2010. Later acquired by Architecture For Humanity
- Headquarters: Seattle, United States
- Website: www.worldchanging.com

Worldchanging was a nonprofit online publisher that operated from 2003 to 2010. Its strapline was A bright green future. It published newsletters and books about sustainability, bright green environmentalism, futurism and social innovation.

== History ==
Worldchanging was launched in October 2003 in San Francisco by Alex Steffen, Jamais Cascio, and a core of initial contributors. In 2005, Worldchanging moved its offices to Seattle, Washington. In early 2006, Cascio left to form the website Open the Future.

From 2005–2010, Worldchanging was headquartered in Seattle with Alex Steffen as executive editor and editorial lead, Julia Levitt and Amanda Reed as managing editors, and several contributing editors including Jeremy Faludi and Sarah Rich. It relied extensively on an international network of writers and correspondents.

Worldchanging was overseen by a board of directors, led by Worldchanging's chairman, the environmental photographer Edward Burtynsky until May 2010. Worldchanging was supported by grants, book sales, speaker fees and reader donations.

On November 29, 2010, Worldchanging announced that due to fundraising difficulties it would shut down. It was acquired by Architecture for Humanity in September, 2011. That organization subsequently filed for bankruptcy in January 2015, and the Worldchanging website became unavailable around March 2016.

== Content ==
Cynicism is often seen as a rebellious attitude in western popular culture, but in reality, our cynicism advances the desires of the powerful:

cynicism is obedience.

— Alex Steffen, "Go Bright Green", The Guardian

Worldchanging practiced "solutions-based journalism": countering cynicism by highlighting possible solutions to the planet's most pressing problems rather than just reporting on those problems and their causes.

In the opening paragraph of its manifesto, Worldchanging declared:

Worldchanging is a solutions-based online magazine that works from a simple premise: that the tools, models and ideas for building a better future lie all around us. That plenty of people are working on tools for change, but the fields in which they work remain unconnected. That the motive, means and opportunity for profound positive change are already present. That another world is not just possible, it's here. We only need to put the pieces together.

== Impact ==
It made me proud to call myself an environmentalist again

— Ross Robertson.

This pithy remark is an indication of the impact Worldchanging had in the first decade of the twenty-first century. Much environmental reporting of the time was preoccupied with predictions of social and ecological collapse unless there was a wholescale retreat from industrial modernism. Worldchanging provided a welcome breath of optimism. It demonstrated that, not only were there solutions to even the most pressing problems, they were available now. This school of thought has come to be known as bright green environmentalism.

Reflecting on the closure of Worldchanging in 2010, Andrew Revkin contrasted its work with The World Without Us, which examined how quickly nature would erase the works of civilisation were humans to suddenly disappear. He summarised Worldchanging's work as taking on "the tougher challenge of charting life on the World *with* us".

== Critical reception ==
Wired columnist Bruce Sterling called Worldchanging "The best collaborative weblog in the whole wide world". Journalist and author Bill McKibben considered it "one of the most professional and interesting Web sites that you could possibly bookmark on your browser". Author Architect Richard Meier named it as his favorite site and praised it for having "a wealth of information on sustainability".

Alex Steffen gave a TED global talk in 2005, and Jamais Cascio gave a TED talk in 2006.

Worldchanging won or was a finalist for the following awards and prizes:

- Winner of the 2004 Utne Independent Press Award for Best Online Cultural Coverage.
- Finalist in 2005 Webby for Best Blog.
- Finalist in 2005 Bloggie for Best Non-Weblog Content of a Weblog Site.
- Finalist in 2006 Bloggie for Best Group Weblog.
- Finalist in 2007 Webby for Best Magazine.
- Official Honoree in 2008 Webby.

In 2007, Time Magazine named Worldchanging one of the world's top 15 environmental websites. In 2008, Nielsen rated Worldchanging the second leading sustainability site in the world for 2007,

== Worldchanging book ==
In November 2006, Worldchanging published a survey of global innovation, Worldchanging: A User's Guide for the 21st Century with a foreword by Al Gore, design by Stefan Sagmeister, and an introduction by Bruce Sterling. It was a 2007 winner of the Santa Monica Library's Green Prize for sustainable literature, and received a 2007 Organic award. It saw translation into French, German, Korean and several other languages.

=== Reception ===
The book was well received on its release, and was rated highly by the general public on book review sites. The layout and design were also received favourably.

It was "emphatically recommended" by TreeHugger, who praised its structure and, while noting that the coverage was broader than it was deep, also noted that each section contained references to further reading material.

Publishers Weekly concluded that "it's hard to imagine a more complete resource for those hoping to live in a future that is, as editor Steffen puts it, 'bright, green, free and tough.'".

Writing in the New York Review of Books, Bill McKibben described the book as seeking answers to the question 'how we can radically transform our daily lives?'. He found it had a refreshingly pragmatic approach, although he also felt it placed a little too much emphasis on the individual over the Government as agents of change.

Looking past observations that "... it leans left and it appears to downplay the role of markets as a possible solution", Bloomberg Businessweek's Bruce Nussbaum found Worldchanging to be "full of innovation and pragmatic solutions.".

Writing in New Scientist, Andrew Simms was less enthusiastic. While he thought it made the "positive point that all is not hopeless, and that there are more ways of improving the human lot than are being used", he also thought it "betrayed a technocratic mindset that sought to impose solutions from outside a problem, rather than acknowledging that those inside a problem [refugees] know perfectly well what they need.".

In The Guardian, children's author Josh Lacey described the book as "a vision of how things might look if the geeks inherit the Earth." He found the brief articles contributed by over sixty authors ranged from practical suggestions for changing your daily life to simple inspirations, but that "... all this information is sandwiched between thick slices of polemic. The wide-eyed gusto does sometimes get a bit irritating." Lacey did conclude on a positive note, describing the book itself as "Elegantly produced and built to last" and that having all this information available to hand was "... a pretty good reminder of why books aren't yet redundant and probably won't be for a long time."

There were less favourable reviews. Several commentators asked how a website that promoted sustainability could justify consuming resources to publish a 600-page hardcover book and conduct a national tour to promote it (a sentiment foreshadowed by Sterling's reference to "a dizzyingly comprehensive chunk of treeware" in his Introduction on p 14). The book's publishers noted on the back page that they recorded the ecological costs and applied the appropriate offsets. The criticism may be taken as an illustration of the differences between 'bright' and 'dark' green thinking.

=== Revised edition ===
Worldchanging, Revised Edition: A User's Guide for the 21st Century was issued in 2011 as a revision with updated technological material, relating to sustainable living, including some 160 new entries relating to food security, sustainable transport, carbon neutrality, ecotourism and updated information on the emerging local food movement. Again, it rated well with the general public but, by the time of publication, Worldchanging had ceased operations and the book received virtually no coverage in editorial columns.
