= Greatest Hits (Billy Idol album) =

Greatest hits album by Billy Idol
- Released: 27 March 2001
- Recorded: 1981–1993
- Genre: New wave; punk rock; hard rock; post-punk
- Length: 71:50
- Label: Capitol

Billy Idol chronology
| Cyberpunk (1993) | Greatest Hits (2001) | VH1 Storytellers (2002) |

Professional ratings
Review scores
| Source | Rating |
|---|---|
| AllMusic | 4/5 stars |

Greatest Hits is a compilation of Billy Idol's most popular singles, released by Capitol Records in 2001. The album includes two additional tracks: a live recording of one of his most popular songs, "Rebel Yell" (this live acoustic version was recorded in 1993 and appeared as a B-side for the single "Speed" in 1994), plus a new version of Idol's longtime producer Keith Forsey's "Don't You (Forget About Me)". Although Forsey originally wrote the song with Idol in mind, Idol turned it down and eventually the song was given to Simple Minds who would go on to make it a worldwide hit in 1985. Greatest Hits was certified platinum by the RIAA in 2005.

== Track listing ==
| No. | Title | Writer(s) | Length |
|---|---|---|---|
| 1. | "Dancing with Myself" (Don't Stop EP version) | Billy Idol, Tony James | 4:50 |
| 2. | "Mony Mony" | Tommy James, Bo Gentry, Ritchie Cordell, Bobby Bloom | 5:01 |
| 3. | "Hot in the City" | B. Idol | 3:33 |
| 4. | "White Wedding" | B. Idol | 4:12 |
| 5. | "Rebel Yell" | B. Idol, Steve Stevens | 4:46 |
| 6. | "Eyes Without a Face" | B. Idol, S. Stevens | 4:57 |
| 7. | "Flesh for Fantasy" | B. Idol, S. Stevens | 4:37 |
| 8. | "Catch My Fall" | B. Idol | 3:41 |
| 9. | "To Be a Lover" | William Bell, Booker T. Jones | 3:52 |
| 10. | "Don't Need a Gun" (single edit) | B. Idol | 5:23 |
| 11. | "Sweet Sixteen" | B. Idol | 4:14 |
| 12. | "Cradle of Love" | B. Idol, David Werner | 4:38 |
| 13. | "L.A. Woman" (single edit) | Jim Morrison, John Densmore, Robby Krieger, Ray Manzarek | 4:03 |
| 14. | "Shock to the System" | B. Idol, Mark Younger-Smith | 3:36 |
| 15. | "Rebel Yell" (live and acoustic) | B. Idol, S. Stevens | 5:35 |
| 16. | "Don't You (Forget About Me)" | Keith Forsey, Steve Schiff | 4:52 |

== Charts ==
=== Weekly charts ===
2001 weekly chart performance for Greatest Hits
| Chart (2001) | Peak position |
|---|---|
| Austrian Albums (Ö3 Austria) | 43 |
| Canadian Alternative Albums (Nielsen Soundscan) | 28 |
| Danish Albums (Hitlisten) | 16 |
| European Albums (Music & Media) | 27 |
| Finnish Albums (Suomen virallinen lista) | 2 |
| German Albums (Offizielle Top 100) | 12 |
| New Zealand Albums (RMNZ) | 3 |
| Norwegian Albums (VG-lista) | 4 |
| Portuguese Albums (AFP) | 5 |
| Swedish Albums (Sverigetopplistan) | 12 |
| Swiss Albums (Schweizer Hitparade) | 30 |
| US Billboard 200 | 74 |

2005 weekly chart performance for Greatest Hits
| Chart (2005) | Peak position |
|---|---|
| UK Albums (OCC) | 171 |

2025 weekly chart performance for Greatest Hits
| Chart (2025) | Peak position |
|---|---|
| Greek Albums (IFPI) | 33 |

=== Year-end charts ===
Year-end chart performance for Greatest Hits
| Chart (2001) | Position |
|---|---|
| Finnish Albums (Suomen virallinen lista) | 46 |

| Chart (2002) | Position |
|---|---|
| Canadian Alternative Albums (Nielsen SoundScan) | 111 |

== Certifications ==
Certifications for Greatest Hits
| Region | Certification | Certified units/sales |
|---|---|---|
| Finland (Musiikkituottajat) | Gold | 18,526 |
| Germany (BVMI) | Gold | 150,000^{^} |
| New Zealand (RMNZ) | Platinum | 15,000^{^} |
| Norway (IFPI Norway) | Gold | 25,000^{*} |
| United Kingdom (BPI) | Gold | 100,000^{*} |
| United States (RIAA) | Platinum | 1,000,000^{^} |
^{*} Sales figures based on certification alone.^{^} Shipments figures based on certification alone.
