= Cyberpunk (album) =

1993 studio album by Billy Idol

Studio album by Billy Idol
- Released: 28 June 1993
- Recorded: April 1992 – January 1993
- Studios: Billy Idol's home studio (Los Angeles); Ameraycan (Hollywood); Golgotha (Hawaii)
- Genres: Electronic rock; electronica; hard rock; new wave; post-punk; dance
- Length: 71:38
- Label: Chrysalis
- Producer: Robin Hancock

Billy Idol chronology
Charmed Life (1990)	Cyberpunk (1993)	Greatest Hits (2001)

2006 re-release
- The 2006 reissue of Cyberpunk was included in Collectables Records' Priceless Collection series.

Singles from Cyberpunk
- 1. "Heroin" Released: 4 May 1993 (US); 2. "Shock to the System" Released: 8 June 1993; 3. "Adam in Chains" Released: 20 September 1993

Cyberpunk is the fifth studio album by the English rock singer Billy Idol, released on 28 June 1993 by Chrysalis Records. A concept album, it was inspired by his personal interest in technology and his first attempts to use computers in the creation of his music. Idol based the album on the cyberdelic subculture of the late 1980s and early 1990s. Heavily experimental in its style, the album was an attempt to take control of the creative process in the production of his albums, while simultaneously introducing Idol's fans and other musicians to the opportunities presented by digital media.

The album featured a cyberpunk-styled narrative, as well as synthesised vocals and industrial influences. Despite its critical and commercial failure, Billy Idol set several precedents in the process of promoting the album. These included his use of the Internet, e-mail,^{[I]} virtual communities, and multimedia software, each a first for a mainstream celebrity. Idol also based his fashion style, music videos, and stage shows on cyberpunk themes and aesthetics.

Released to negative reviews, Cyberpunk polarised internet communities of the time, with detractors viewing it as an act of cooptation and opportunistic commercialisation. It was also seen as part of a process that saw the overuse of the term "cyberpunk" until it lost its original meaning. Alternatively, supporters saw Idol's efforts as harmless and well-intentioned, and were encouraged by his new interest in cyberculture.

== Background ==
During the release of 1990's Charmed Life, Idol suffered a broken leg in a motorcycle accident. While in recovery, he was interviewed by Legs McNeil. McNeil noticed the electronic muscle stimulator on Idol's leg and referred to him as a "cyberpunk", citing the cyborg qualities of his appearance. This led to Idol taking a serious interest in the works of William Gibson for the first time, although he had read Neuromancer in the mid-'80s. In the following months, Idol continued to investigate cyberpunk fiction and technology. He also read Neal Stephenson's Snow Crash, works by Robert Anton Wilson, and others.

I threw off the shackles of the past... I was looking for a way to break the stalemate I'd gotten into, which was boring me to death, really.

— Billy Idol

At approximately the same time, he began to work with Trevor Rabin to create his music, having parted ways with his former producer, Keith Forsey. Rabin introduced Idol to his home studio, which was centralised around Rabin's Macintosh computer and music software. The ability to personally produce music from his home, rather than at a professional studio, appealed to Idol's "do it yourself" ethic. He felt that working through a team of producers and sound engineers cut into his personal vision for previous albums, and was interested in being more directly in control of his future work. Idol asked his producer, Robin Hancock, to educate himself and his guitarist, Mark Younger-Smith, on the use of software for musical production.

With his increasing exposure to technology and science fiction, Idol decided to base his upcoming album on the cyberpunk genre, and quickly set about educating himself in Cyberdelic counter culture. Idol saw the convergence of affordable technology with the music industry and anticipated its impact on a new era for DIY punk music. "It's 1993," Idol said during a New York Times interview. "I better wake up and be part of it. I'm sitting there, a 1977 punk watching Courtney Love talk about punk, watching Nirvana talk about punk, and this is my reply."

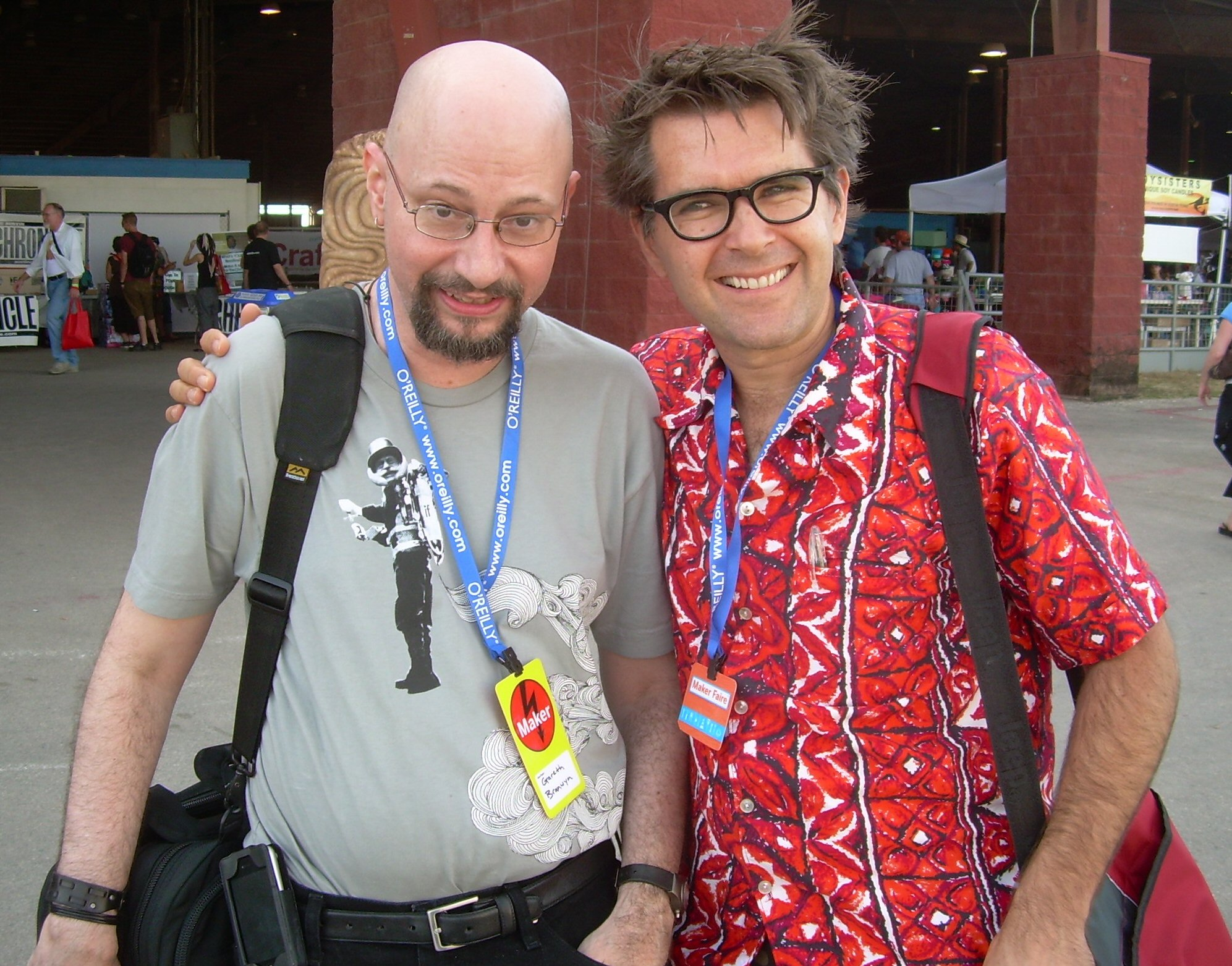
Gareth Branwyn (left) and Mark Frauenfelder (right) were two consultants from the cyberdelic print culture tapped by Idol for consultation.

Reading Mondo 2000 and Gareth Branwyn's 1992 manifesto, "Is There a Cyberpunk Movement?", Idol resolved to base an opening sequence on Branwyn's essay, contacting the writer for permission. He also read Branwyn's Beyond Cyberpunk! HyperCard stack, a collection of essays based on fanzines, political tracts, conspiracy theories, and which referred to itself as "a do-it-yourself guide to the future." Idol proceeded to consult with various writers familiar with the computer related magazines, such as Mondo 2000, and Boing Boing. Idol also hosted a "cyber-meeting" attended by the likes of Timothy Leary, famed counterculture guru; Jaime Levy, author of books published on disks under the "Electronic Hollywood" imprint; R. U. Sirius, co-founder of Mondo 2000; and Brett Leonard, director of The Lawnmower Man.

Asked by Idol about how he could become further involved in cyberculture, Branwyn and Mark Frauenfelder advised him to investigate The WELL, one of the oldest online communities. Idol did so, discussing the album project online with WELL users, and creating a personal e-mail account which he released on printed advertisements for the upcoming album, so that fans could communicate with him.^{[I]} Idol also made occasional postings to alt.cyberpunk, a Usenet newsgroup. Later in an interview for MTV News promoting the album, Idol expressed excitement over the medium. "This means I can be in touch with millions of people, but on my own terms."

== Recording ==
Wasteland
Sample of "Wasteland", the second track from the album. The lyrics of "Wasteland" reference computer hacking and high technology. The lyric "no religion at all" was later used as the title of Idol's 1993 European tour: the No Religion Tour.

Shock to the System
Sample of "Shock to the System", the fourth track from the album. The sample illustrates the influence of the Los Angeles riots of 1992 on the lyrics. A sound clip of an electric current is used as a play on the phrase "shock".

Adam in Chains
Sample of "Adam in Chains", the sixth track from the album. An ethereal song divided in two sections: the first part consists of a voice coaxing the listener through a hypnotic exercise; the remainder of the song consists of Idol singing in a melodious, slow tempo.

Heroin
Sample of "Heroin", the eleventh track from the album. Idol's high-tempo, dance interpretation of the song by The Velvet Underground includes a lyric from Patti Smith's cover version of "Gloria".

Cyberpunk was created in Idol's home studio in Los Angeles, centred around his Macintosh computer and accompanying software. Programs used in the production included Opcode Studio Vision, and Digidesign Pro Tools. Idol later recalled that the beginning of the recording sessions coincided with the onset of the 1992 Los Angeles riots. "We'd just installed the computer in my music room, and there was a window above it overlooking the whole city. And there was a fire raging. There was smoke just pouring across the whole of LA. It was LA burning. And so I just straight quickly wrote the lyrics and sang them three times. What you're hearing on the single 'Shock to the System' is my news reportage of what I'm seeing." Idol recalled for a German broadcast. "We started the album with a riot. So that's really rock and roll."

External videos
- "A Creative Moment with Tim Leary and Billy Idol", Allan Lundell, YouTube, 11 February 2009. Billy Idol is joined by Timothy Leary and other musicians in the process of recording one of the many intermission tracks for the album. Leary's voice in this recording was later used for track number 15 segue.

Excited by the DIY aspects of the production process, Idol took only ten months to record the album, which he often contrasted with the combined period of eight years it took to create his two previous albums. Working with his computer over time also gave him the sense that the computer was itself an instrument, and that the performer's style was also presented by the technology. Its versatility also allowed him to switch roles with Mark Younger-Smith and Robin Hancock, allowing each to experiment with their different talents and blurring the lines of their specialised roles, leading Idol to repeatedly compare the production process to that of being in a garage band. Keyboards were also used to drive much of the music through the album. Together, the trio comprised what Idol considered to be the "core" production group, although a number of artists contributed to a various tracks. In particular, he credited his drummer Tal Bergman and bassist Doug Wimbish for their contributions to numerous tracks. Wimbish had recorded his work from a studio in New York City, and sent it to Los Angeles for use in the production.

== Themes ==
Cyberpunk was a departure from Idol's previous style of pop-rock music. Several spoken or sound-effect segues were placed between the album tracks to create a linear narrative. The effect of these segues caused the album to become a concept album. Karen Schoemer, of the New York Times, commented that "[w]ith its booming techno beats, screeching guitar riffs, sampled computer voices and songs like 'Power Junkie' ('I feel tonight we're bought and sold/Ah yeah, I think I'll overload'), the album functions as Mr. Idol's interpretation of cyber culture."

Billy and I were both really influenced by 'Neuromancer'... We both loved the ideas and the technology. Billy really wanted to create something that would parallel that world.

— Mark Younger-Smith

When asked why he was pursuing such a shift in his musical style by adopting electronic music, Idol responded that he had attempted to incorporate technology in his older work, but found the equipment of the late 1970s and early 1980s too limiting and gave up. With the computers of the 1990s, Idol finally felt that the technology was able to quickly and easily make changes as he saw fit. Idol came to expound on his belief in their future importance for the music industry, and quoting Gareth Branwyn, referred to the computer as "the new cool tool".

However, he rejected the idea of referring to the music as "computerized", on the grounds that nothing was done for the album that could not have been done with standard recording equipment, and that the computer had simply sped up and simplified the creative process. Placing emphasis on the contribution of the performers over the computer tools they used, Idol felt the album achieved a "garage band" spirit, that had captured the "Sturm und Drang" he found in rock and roll, and had simply modified it digitally. Idol thus felt that the album could be best identified as a rock album, rather than a techno album. Idol later agreed with an interviewer who commented that the album's digital production and themes were ahead of their time.

=== Technology ===
I was always very interested in the Internet... It [Cyberpunk] was really all about the effects the Internet would have on us.

— Billy Idol, "Billy Idol Goes Back To the Future".

Idol was keen to share his ideas regarding the future of Cyberculture and its impact on the music industry, and was noted for his enthusiastic speculation in the future of computers throughout the promotion of the album. "You're using very sort of extreme and raw ideas, but with very high level technology... it's probably whats going to be happening—or in fact, it is what is happening now—because that's how we made this album, Cyberpunk." Some of the predictions Idol made for the future of the internet, computers, and musicians, was that it would allow for cheap and efficient recording from home; that musicians could record their music and send it to producers and fellow band members from great distances, perhaps while on tour; and that musicians would be able to directly communicate with their fans and critics. Idol also hoped that the rapid ability to do whatever he desired with the production would allow raw forms of rock music to remain relevant after the Grunge movement swept America in the early 1990s. "[The computer] can do anything... If you want the music backwards, it can be backwards in a snap. This is in a way my sort of answer to grunge. I know there's a way of using this modern technology to bring a lot of rawness back."

=== Fashion ===
On 24 September 1992, Idol took part in a benefit fashion show by Jean-Paul Gaultier. The event, entitled the "Jean Paul Gaultier in L.A.", was a fashion benefit for amfAR AIDS research, at the Shrine Auditorium. Idol modelled a leather jacket and pants, covered in black sunglasses, to the yet-unreleased song "Neuromancer". This coincided with Idol's decision to change his fashion style to match the cyberpunk aesthetic of the album. Idol changed his hair to dreadlocks, and wore sleek, futuristic clothing by New York fashion designer Stephen Sprouse. In a photo shoot published in Details July 1993 issue, highlighting Billy Idol's new "cyberpunk" aesthetic, Idol modelled in a distressed-velvet jacket and matching trousers designed by Paul Smith. In the background, Idol stood amongst computers and chaotically strewn cables representing his home studio. Idol wore the same suit during the "Shock to the System" music video and the 1993 Billboard Music Award presentation spot.

=== Special edition software ===
During his initial research into cyberculture, Idol ordered Beyond Cyberpunk! from Gareth Branwyn. The HyperCard stack, which included collections of essays on cyberpunk culture, inspired Idol to include similar material within the Cyberpunk album as a special edition digipak feature. Discussing the matter with Branwyn, Idol received an initial bid for the job of producing the disk from the writer. While this bid was under consideration by Idol's management company, Idol had purchased a book-on-disk by Jaime Levy at a Los Angeles bookstore. At the time, Levy was the author and publisher of Electronic Hollywood, one of the first magazines produced on floppy disk. Impressed by its contents, Idol set about contacting her for the job of producing the disk. Being an innovative designer with a punk-rock aesthetic, she was given the job and a master tape of recorded songs – which were not yet compiled into CD format – for use in sampling. Levy was given permission to include whatever content she desired. Meeting Idol to find what he was interested in presenting in the disk, his only concern was that the cyberpunk genre be represented as authentically as possible.

CD-ROM, which allows computers to supersede compact disc players, is the next step for savvy musicians on the cutting edge.

— Julie Romandetta

The special edition diskette, a Macintosh press kit entitled "Billy Idol's Cyberpunk", was an industry first. It included album clip art, sample sound bytes, a biography by Mark Frauenfelder, lyrics, and a cyberculture bibliography by Gareth Branwyn. Frauenfelder appeared on a segment of MTV News to describe the diskette's features. Plans were considered by EMI/Chrysalis to re-release the album in the following fall with an updated CD-ROM if the album was successful. As CD-ROMs were prohibitively expensive at the time of production, this was anticipated as a potential benchmark event for the music industry. However, this failed to materialise due to the critical and financial failure of the album.

=== Computer graphic design ===
After reading the work of Mark Frauenfelder on Boing Boing, Idol hired him to use graphics software in the design of artwork associated with the album. This included its use for the album and singles' cover art, the Billy Idol's Cyberpunk floppy disk, and in the press pack released to the media.

Frauenfelder worked with Adobe Photoshop, while Idol was present for the design process to provide suggestions. The album cover itself was the first image created, following the initial five minutes of editing on Idol's personal computer at the singer's home.

=== "Blendo" cinematography ===
Inspired by The Lawnmower Man, Idol conceived of using "Blendo" imagery throughout the promotion of the album. Six music videos were produced with the use of what Idol dubbed "Blendo" cinematography, five for "Heroin" and a final one for "Shock to the System".

=== 1993 No Religion Tour ===
To promote the release of Cyberpunk, Idol began the 1993 No Religion Tour. The title of the tour came from a lyric in the album's first track, "Wasteland", which described a man travelling through a dystopia. In keeping with the album's theme, the performance stages were set to a computerised, high-tech aesthetic. Idol wished to use Blendo imagery on massive television screens behind the stage to rapidly shift in time with the music. Some of the video and photography was shot by Idol and Brett Leonard, including photos of Idol during acupuncture, himself at a spa, various LA landscapes, and imagery which referenced heroin use. An engineer on stage, whom Idol fashioned as another band member, would be charged with altering the images in rhythm with the music, as though it were also an instrument. Multiple engineers with video equipment would also roam the audience, beaming images of the crowd onto the screen as well, creating an interactive show. The tour took place in Europe, performing a total of 19 shows in 18 cities across 11 countries. It began on 18 August 1993 in Berlin, and concluded on 20 September 1993 in London.

Idol hoped to advance the way stagecraft and lighting were used at rock concerts. "Part of the idea is to create an element of visible language," Idol explained during an interview with the New York Times, "so that you feel as if you're being talked to through images. I think you have to start looking to get to the future of what rock-and-roll concerts should be like. We're working; we're pushing the technology to the edge."

=== Music videos ===
Three of four Cyberpunk singles were promoted by music videos: "Heroin", "Shock to the System", and "Adam in Chains". The fourth single, "Wasteland", did not receive a music video.

The first single, "Heroin", was accompanied with the most music videos, with a total of five for several different remixed versions of the cover. Each was a "Blendo" video which rapidly shifted random imagery and colours in time with the music. Four of the music videos for the song were directed by Brett Leonard, with a fifth being credited to Howard Deutch. Each used stock footage shot by Idol and Leonard, filmed personally and edited on Idol's computer. Idol did so with the intention of sending a "do-it-yourself" message that mocked and rejected the standards of MTV music video creation. "We did it all on camcorder and we sort of wanted to say you can make your own videos, and you don't always have to do it in a very MTV way." None were released for rotation on television; instead, one was included in the video album release, Cyberpunk: Shock to the System.

A "blendo" video was also produced for "Shock to the System", being included in the Cyberpunk: Shock to the System VHS cassette.

External videos
- "Shock to the System", EMI America Records, YouTube, 9 March 2009.

The second single, "Shock to the System", which was inspired by the Los Angeles riots of 1992, received the first music video put into MTV rotation. As Idol explained for MTV News, he had originally created the song with an entirely different set of lyrics, but upon witnessing the riots on television he immediately rewrote and recorded them that day. Idol explained that he was trying to capture the political and economic conflict that had created the LA Riots. Idol further felt that the camcorder – as displayed in the witnessing of the Rodney King beating – was a "potent way of conveying ideas" and an important metaphor for technology used in rebellion.

The music video was set in a dystopian future controlled by Cyber-cops (referred to as such by director Brett Leonard.) It depicted an individual who records the Cyber-cops beating a man, only to be noticed and attacked himself. His camera is destroyed and the Cyber-cops leave him unconscious on the ground, as they are busy trying to put down a riot elsewhere in the city. Alone, his camera equipment lands on him and is absorbed into his body, causing him to dramatically morph into a cyborg. The cyborg then joins the riot, leading the rebels to victory.

The make-up effects were achieved through stop motion, with Billy Idol moving in slow stages during points of the filming, allowing the make up effects to gradually cover more of his body to create the illusion of metamorphosis. Stan Winston, who had previously worked on the Terminator series and Jurassic Park, supervised and created the special effects for the video. The music video for "Shock to the System" was nominated for "Best Special Effects in a Video" and "Best Editing in a Video" at the 1993 MTV Video Music Awards, losing both times to Peter Gabriel's video for "Steam".

The final music video, "Adam in Chains", was directed by Julien Temple. It depicted Billy Idol being bound into a chair as he is monitored by scientists. He struggles before being hypnotised, and is then inserted into a virtual reality simulator. There he is treated to an ethereal water fantasy. Idol eventually rejects the fantasy, which is consumed in flames as, in the real world, his body violently convulses. The scientists end the experiment and Idol is brought back into reality, only to fall unconscious.

=== Cyberpunk: Shock to the System ===
Cyberpunk: Shock to the System

Video by Billy Idol
- Released: 29 June 1993 (VHS)
- Genres: Rock; electronica
- Length: 24:16
- Label: Chrysalis

Billy Idol chronology
Billy Idol: The Charmed Life and Other Vital Videos (1990)	Cyberpunk: Shock to the System (1993)

A supplementary VHS cassette was also produced to promote the album. Cyberpunk: Shock to the System included a director's cut version of the "Shock to the System" music video; Shockumentary, a mini-documentary on the making of the aforementioned video; and two music videos which made use of Blendo images, one for "Heroin" (Overlords mix) and "Shock to the System". The production was directed by Brett Leonard, having already directed the "Shock to the System" music video. Its cover art featured images of the cyborg freedom fighter played by Billy Idol in the "Shock to the System" music video, and included taglines that suggested a story of a dystopian world of high technology and rebellion.

Cyberpunk: Shock to the System
Segments	Length
Shock to the System (Director's Cut)	3:33
Shockumentary: The Making of Shock to the System	9:22
Heroin: "Blendo"	7:48
Shock to the System: "Blendo"	3:33
Total running time	24:16

== Release ==
A press pack was distributed to the media prior to its release to promote the album. The centerpiece of the pack was a copy of the Billy Idol's Cyberpunk custom stickered 3½" floppy disk, which was housed in a custom multi-coloured folder with artist and title logo on the front and contact information on the back. The pack included a 5-page version of the biography in the diskette, for the benefit of any journalist who lacked the equipment to operate the floppy disk. Also included in the pack were three black-and-white publicity photographs. Two pictures of Idol were taken by Peter Gravelle and the other was a digitally edited image of Idol as he appeared in the blendo video, "Heroin".

As we get set to address a new millennium, science and technology are becoming the new weapons of change, and who better to arm you for the future battle than BILLY IDOL.

— Cyberpunk press release, Chrysalis Records.

As part of press junkets promoting the album, Idol reportedly insisted attending journalists be familiar with cyberpunk fiction. It was also revealed that Idol was not entirely as familiar with the genre as he had proclaimed. William Gibson reported in an interview, "A London journalist told me when Billy did his 'Cyberpunk' press junket over there, he made it a condition of getting an interview with him, that every journalist had to have read Neuromancer...Anyway, they all did but when they met with Billy, the first thing that became really apparent was that Billy hadn't read it. So they called him on it, and he said he didn't need to..he just absorbed it through a kinda osmosis."

Upon release, the album did not fare well, failing to make the top 20 in either the UK or United States. Instead, the album debuted at No. 48 on the Billboard 200 on 17 July 1993, and quickly plummeted to No. 192 in seven weeks before falling off the chart completely. The album saw slightly better chart placings in Europe, where it peaked at No. 5 in Austria, and No. 15 in Switzerland. By January 2002, the album had sold 164,000 copies in the United States, according to Nielsen SoundScan.

The first two singles fared slightly better. "Heroin", a cover of the Velvet Underground song, peaked at No. 16 on the Hot Dance Club Play chart. "Shock to the System" peaked at No. 7 on the Hot Mainstream Rock Tracks chart, No. 23 on the Hot Modern Rock Tracks chart, and No. 5 on Bubbling Under Hot 100 Singles chart. The last two singles, "Adam in Chains" and "Wasteland", both failed to achieve any chart ratings within the United States, but did in other countries.

== Critical reception ==
Professional ratings
Review scores
Source	Rating
AllMusic	2/5 stars
Christgau's Consumer Guide	C−
Entertainment Weekly	B+
NME	4/10
Rolling Stone	2/5 stars
Select	1/5 medals
Spin Alternative Record Guide	1/10

Cyberpunk was mostly received negatively by critics, with some stating that the album was pretentious and meandering. They said Idol sounded like a man desperate to keep up with current trends. Stephen Thomas Erlewine of AllMusic considered the album a failed attempt by Idol to recast himself for the 1990s, and judged the content of the album as being mostly "padded with pretentious speeches, sampled dialog, and underdeveloped songs". He also referred to the cover of "Heroin" as "one of the worst covers ever recorded".

Taking note of Idol's assertion that he had attempted to use technology in creating his early music, Ira Robbins of Newsday was sceptical. "[It] is hardly obvious in his work." Though if his early work had been mild attempts to use technology, Cyberpunk itself, Robbins wrote, was "the sound of science gone too far". The ideology of futurism Idol adopted was panned by Robbins, while the music itself was hardly different from his previous work. "For the most part, other than keyboards that add a pervasive nod to the jittering beat of techno-rave music, Cyberpunk sounds pretty much like every other Idol album."

Manuel Esparza of The Daily Cougar wrote a more mixed review, praising some elements, such as the track "Shangrila", the use of sound space echo effects, and Idol's talent as a singer. However, Esparza felt that Idol attempted the same techniques across too many songs, and referred to the lyrics as "[just barely making] more sense than a monkey pounding away on a typewriter". The "Billy Idol" entry on TrouserPress.com skewered Cyberpunk as a "third-rate self-parody... that trusses him up in sci-fi lingo and futurist mumbo jumbo."

Johnny Dee of NME believed that the album is still "predominated" by the "same basic ingredients of mock rebel gesturing and fist-pumping melodrama" which Idol is known for. He felt it "just sounds more digital, shrink-wrapped and synthetic" than before, and added his belief that it would do well commercially for Idol by stating that there are "more than enough chant-along hits to keep him on MTV for another couple of years". Entertainment Weekly presented a favourable review of the album, giving it a "B+" rating and stating, "...this is old-fashioned glam-pop—as dumb, and occasionally glorious, as it gets." Two months later, Weekly included Idol on a list of "surprise losers", following the album's ranking of No. 48 on the Billboard charts.

=== Cyberculture reception ===
Every counter-culture is, for a brief initial period, the sole domain of a handful of founding elites who inevitably find a certain sense of superiority in the exclusive nature of their undertaking. The 'cyberpunk' movement – term used as loosely as it was intended to be – takes a particularly hypocritical stance in this case since the principle messages of the movement have been aimed at a loosening, opening-up and liberating attitude toward information and the use of tech.

— A post to The WELL and alt.cyberpunk,
quoted by Gareth Branwyn.

Prior to the album's release, Idol was asked if he feared his new interest in technology would be seen as an attempt to co-opt cyberculture. Idol denied this, stating that his belief in the relevancy of cyberpunk culture was genuine, and that he did not care what others thought of him. However, the reaction by the majority of the online community was openly hostile and suspicious of Idol's motives. It was reported that his e-mail account on the WELL received mail from angry computer users, and was occasionally flooded with e-mail spam to antagonise him. Idol was also cast by many as a naive, tech-illiterate poseur. The charge of illiteracy was not entirely false, as at the time of the album's release, Idol was still typing using the "hunt and peck" system, and needed notes to log onto the internet.

External videos
- "Tim Leary and the Cyberpunks", Allan Lundell, YouTube, 11 February 2009. Timothy Leary promoting the cyberdelic subculture which thematically informed the creation of the album.
- "Timothy Leary Interviews Billy Idol – In Concert with The Ramones" (1993), an interview discussing the Cyberpunk album for the ABC television show, In Concert, hosted by the Internet Archive.

In defending himself from what he believed was the elitism of his online critics, Idol admitted that he was still learning about computers, but compared it to the early punk ethic of simply trying your best as a musician, even if you had difficulty. He also pointed out that William Gibson was computer illiterate when he wrote Neuromancer. "I don't know much about computers, but I have the desire to learn and I have a computer and a modem, so I go for it. Banging my head sometimes, but continuing on."

Idol was also criticised for his use of the term "cyberpunk" for his album title, as detractors alleged that he had no claim to a title which belonged to the entire movement. Idol responded that he was not approaching the movement with a sense of entitlement. "I ain't no rock star. I'm an eager student," Idol wrote on a post to the WELL. Regarding his use of the "cyberpunk" moniker, Idol refuted claims that he had ever called himself one, and instead used the name as an ode to the subculture. "I was revved up by the DIY energy of Gibson and the high-tech underground."

Gareth Branwyn, who was among the initial tech-experts Idol consulted, defended Idol's interest in cyberpunk. "Billy is genuinely interested in and excited by cyberculture, and like all the rest of us, wants to factor that interest into his work, which happens to be pop music. Whether presenting cyberculture in that forum is ultimately a good thing or not is beside the point of Billy's right to bring it to that forum. After all, access to information should be free and total, right? Or at least that's how the mythology goes." An update to Branwyn's Beyond Cyberpunk! hyper-card stack included a new introduction, which referred to the Cyberpunk controversy, frankly stating "The release of Billy Idol's album Cyberpunk was met with a hailstorm of controversy on the Net, as young cyber-Turks whined about how he had ripped them off and destroyed their secret club." In his book Borg Like Me: & Other Tales of Art, Eros, and Embedded Systems, Branwyn noticed how "cardboard cutout image" of Billy Idol and his motives forever changed his view of people in celebrities position and "how we and the media so harshly judge them and interpret their motives (seemingly always to default to the most nefarious ones) without knowing or caring about the truth".

Mark Frauenfelder also defended Idol, pointing out the elitist hypocrisy of the WELL community, and highlighted the perceived pointlessness of the conflict. "There are all these 16- and 17-year-old cyberpunks who are afraid that everybody's going to learn their secret handshake or something." Andy Hawks, original maintainer of the alt.cyberpunk Frequently Asked Questions list, and founder of the Future Culture mailing list, criticised what he perceived to be a double standard among Idol's critics in questioning his motivation behind creating the album and his choice of associating on internet forums.

Penn Jillette, then a columnist for PC/Computing, accepted that Idol was not well versed in computers, but considered it a non-issue. "I'm tempted to call him a computer 'poser' but that's not the point. [...] He's not a poser. He's a fan of computers, and he doesn't claim to be more. [...] He's not a fan of computers because he can write code, he's a fan because he knows that whatever is really happening nowadays is happening around computers."

Regardless, Cyberpunk is still seen as having been an act of hyped commercialisation. In Escape Velocity: Cyberculture at the End of the Century, Mark Dery commented on the mainstreaming of the cyberpunk subculture. He viewed Idol as representing some of the worst abuses this took, deriding Cyberpunk as "a bald-faced appropriation of every cyberpunk cliché that wasn't nailed down." In 1995, when writer Jack Boulware asked "When did cyberpunk die?" at a meeting of former staff members of Mondo 2000, a response was "1993. The release of the Billy Idol record." In a section on "cyberpunk music", The Cyberpunk Project website notes, "...[the] usual opinion is that Billy Idol's album is just commercialization and it has nothing to do with cyberpunk." The F.A.Q for alt.cyberpunk, mirrored on the website, rejects the notion that there is a "cyberpunk fashion". Of Billy Idol's attempts to base his fashion and music on it, it states, "No matter how sincere his intentions might have been, scorn and charges of commercialization have been heaped upon him in this and other forums."

Well known music critic, Robert Christgau, excoriated what he considered to be Idol's attempt to co-opt cyberpunk for commercial gain. In particular, he compared Idol's new interest in cyberpunk to the musician's previous co-optation of the punk subculture. "Even if his interest was originally piqued by the dollar signs that appear in front of his eyes whenever he encounters the magic rune p-u-n-k, that's the fate of any good idea—sooner or later it touches people who have no deep connection to it." However, unlike some critics who asserted Idol had no genuine interest in cyberculture, Christgau assumed he did and that this was to be expected, as many subcultures are eventually adopted by mainstream society. The problem, Christgau asserted, was that Idol had no genuine understanding of the concept, and that ultimately Idol could only "[struggle] for, over, or with authenticity, a rock obsession [he's] always kept at arm's length and never escaped."

As one of the founders of the cyberpunk genre, William Gibson has repeatedly been asked for his opinion on the subject of the mainstreaming of cyberpunk, which has often brought up the topic of Idol's album. In a 1994 interview, Gibson said that he did not approve of the way the term "cyberpunk" was being increasingly commercialised by popular culture, and that Idol had "turned it into something very silly". Gibson also said in another interview that to understand cyberpunk as a movement was "something of a joke, as wonderfully demonstrated, not too long ago, by Billy Idol's Cyberpunk album." Despite his negative comments, Gibson was bemused, rather than angered, by Idol's creation. Stating that he'd tried to withhold judgment before hearing the album, he eventually did and said "...I just don't get what he's on about. I don't see the connection. [...] I had lunch with Billy years ago in Hollywood... and I thought he was a very likeable guy. He had a sense of humour about what he was doing that is not apparent in the product he puts out. If I run into him again, we can have a good laugh about what he's doing now!"

=== Academic analysis ===
What the profusion, or lack, of cyberpunk definitions seems to suggest is that either individual cyberpunks have some fairly clear sense of why they are a participant in alt.cyberpunk, but cannot reach consensus, or that they do not have any clear idea, and are just riding a trend or looking for a prepackaged image. Undoubtedly, there are alt.cyberpunks of both types.

— Shawn P. Wilbur, "Running Down the Meme".

Shawn P. Wilbur, a left-libertarian academic then associated with the Bowling Green State University, closely critiqued the concept of the supposed "cyberpunk movement". In an attempt to understand why members of the movement were so negative in reaction to attempts by the mainstream to investigate the cyberpunk meme, he directly investigated the criticism of Billy Idol on alt.cyberpunk. His interpretation of the discussions led him to dub the reactions of alt.cyberpunk the "Panic of '93". It was Wilbur's assertion that the lack of a cohesive understanding of what "cyberpunk" meant was the chief reason for a lack of critical thought displayed during discussions concerning its inspection or adoption by "outsiders".

He concluded, "[u]senet's alt.cyberpunk is both a warning and a promise. It suggests the power of ideas to draw people together, even when they aren't quite sure what those ideas are."

While examining Pat Cadigan's 1991 novel, Synners, Wilbur also referenced the Cyberpunk single, "Shock to the System", interpreting the song on multiple levels. These included the "shock" cyberpunk represented to established forms of science fiction, as well as the "future shock" society felt in reaction to new technology. Wilbur also asserted that the storyline told by the music video neatly fit into the cyberpunk tradition of glorifying social resistance.

The single, "Shock to the System", and its accompanying music video were also heavily analysed for the overtones of racial, sexual, and physical trauma presented within them by Thomas Foster, associate professor at Indiana University, in his 2005 book, The Souls of Cyberfolk.

=== Re-release ===
The album was reissued on 22 August 2006 by Collectables Records as part of its Priceless Collection series. The reissued album did not include the special edition multimedia of the original, but did include new cover art.

== Legacy ==
=== Billy Idol's career ===
Following the Cyberpunk album, Billy Idol did not produce another original album until 2005, 13 years later. However, this was not due to the failure of the album, but rather his dissatisfaction with his producers at Chrysalis Records. With the founding of Sanctuary Records, an independent record label Idol felt positive about, and the formation of a new band with Steve Stevens, Idol decided to produce Devil's Playground. Idol's later album featured a more power pop and classic rock sound similar to Idol's 80s style, and received middling reviews.

During the intermittent years between albums, Idol created music for the Speed and Heavy Metal 2000 film soundtracks and regularly wrote and performed new songs for several tours, but never attempted to experiment with the style he explored in Cyberpunk. In 2001, Idol released a compilation album, Greatest Hits. Only one song from Cyberpunk, "Shock to the System", was included in the collection. In 2008, another compilation album, The Very Best of Billy Idol: Idolize Yourself, was released. Once again, the only song from Cyberpunk to be included was a digital remaster of "Shock to the System". Idol achieved widespread commercial success with his greatest hits material; Greatest Hits went platinum.

In the years following the album's release, musicians who had worked with Idol in the past were asked to comment on the failure of Cyberpunk. Tony James of Sigue Sigue Sputnik, a pop-cyberpunk band, and former bassist for Generation X, weighed in. Though sympathetic to his former bandmate, he felt the stylistic change did not fit Idol. "Billy is always cool but he does Billy Idol rebel yellin the best, i felt cyberpunk was a wrong turning for him..he has his sound..stay great as u are Bill... [sic]" In 2001 Steve Stevens was asked if Idol's declining popularity and the failure of Cyberpunk was related to their split. Stevens rejected the idea, saying of the failed album, "I think the Cyberpunk record people didn't get. I think I would be doing Billy and his fans a great disservice if I said that he needed me for his popularity."

Idol briefly responded once more to the negative reception the album received on two occasions. In 1996, Idol gave an interview for his website in which he was asked if he'd pursue the style of Cyberpunk for a future album. Idol addressed the question by first explaining his interpretation of the failure of the album. "You see the thing about Cyberpunk is that it was supposed to be like a home[-]made record, much like these rap bands are doing, all made really on home equipment. But it was very hard to make people understand that I was sort of making an alternative record. They don't allow you to make an alternative record..." He then stated that he would not be pursuing the same style with any future album. In a 2005 interview, Idol simply stated "the idea that I was trying to do an overground-underground record just wasn't understood at the time." Tony Dimitriades, a prominent music industry producer and manager, interpreted Idol's response at the time. "He realized at that point, 'Well, if that's what people think, maybe I lost touch with my public.'"

While embarking upon a 2010 tour, Idol was asked if he intended to perform music from the Cyberpunk album. While not distancing himself from the production, Idol stated he had no intentions of doing so immediately. Pointing out that he did wish to perform a mixture of new and older works, and would perhaps perform the music in the future, he intended to base his tour on "more guitar music" and pointed out that Cyberpunk's keyboard-driven music was not going to be featured. Idol has performed "Shock to the System" in subsequent live performances.

=== Critical legacy ===
In 1999, The A.V. Club awarded Cyberpunk as the "Least Essential Concept Album" of the 1990s. An accompanying review stated, "The result [of Idol's casting as a "futuristic maverick" and the album itself] is as laughably dated as it is difficult to endure in its entirety." In 2006, Q magazine listed Cyberpunk as No. 5 in their list of the 50 worst albums of all time. Said music critic Parke Puterbaugh, "To make that record in '93, it may have been a number of years ahead of its time actually, because it didn't do terribly well."

=== Music industry's use of technology ===
I was really waiting for this to happen... Way back in the '90s. People didn't even think about computers back when I was a little kid. And now the whole world is a global village, for Christ's sake.

— Billy Idol, "Billy Idol Goes Back To the Future".

The album was prescient for its early advocacy of the use of the internet and software to market albums. The Boston Globe reported, "[Cyberpunk] demands recognition as a style setter, not for its musical content, but for the changes it may prompt in the ways recordings are made and marketed". Idol's early adoption of the internet to communicate with fans was broadened in the years after Cyberpunk's release. By the late '90s, many celebrities had made inroads on to the internet, using official websites and blogs to directly advertise albums and tours to fans, as well as organizing fansites for official fan clubs. Billy Idol's own official fansite was established in 1997. In 2010, Idol continued to pursue his early vision for the integration of his tours with technology by utilising his website to document a world tour through a blog and streaming video feed. "These days, [Idol] sees his own website as his old vision of the future becoming reality."

The inclusion of multimedia software as a special feature was a novelty when Chrysalis Records released the Billy Idol's Cyberpunk diskette. This was also widely adopted by the music industry years later. CD-ROMs were initially considered as a medium for Cyberpunk's multimedia features, but were too expensive at the time of production, and so floppy disks were used instead. Peter Gabriel and Todd Rundgren had previously experimented with CD-ROMs, but it was hoped that if Idol's album had proved popular, it could have been reissued with CD-ROMs, catapulting the format into the music industry's mainstream. This never materialised due to the album's general failures. However, during the late '90s it became increasingly common for some limited edition digipaks to include CD-ROMs, evolving by the early 2000s into the inclusion of DVDs.

== Track listing ==
All tracks are written by Billy Idol and Mark Younger-Smith, except where noted.

Cyberpunk track listing
No.	Title	Writer(s)	Length
1.	"Untitled (Opening Manifesto)"	Gareth Branwyn, edited with additions by Idol, used under license from "Is There a Cyberpunk Movement?" (1992)	1:01
2.	"Wasteland"		4:34
3.	"Untitled (Pre-Shock)"		0:19
4.	"Shock to the System"		3:33
5.	"Tomorrow People"		5:07
6.	"Adam in Chains"	Idol; Robin Hancock	6:23
7.	"Neuromancer"	Idol; Hancock; Ace Mackay-Smith; Greg Stump	4:34
8.	"Power Junkie"		4:46
9.	"Untitled (That Which Beareth Thorns)"		0:27
10.	"Love Labours On"		3:53
11.	"Heroin"	Lou Reed	6:57
12.	"Untitled (Injection)"		0:22
13.	"Shangrila"		7:24
14.	"Concrete Kingdom"		4:52
15.	"Untitled (Galaxy Within)"		0:38
16.	"Venus"		5:47
17.	"Then the Night Comes"		4:37
18.	"Untitled (Before Dawn)"		0:25
19.	"Mother Dawn"	Durga McBroom; Martin Glover	5:03
20.	"Recap"		0:56
Total length:			71:38

== Personnel ==
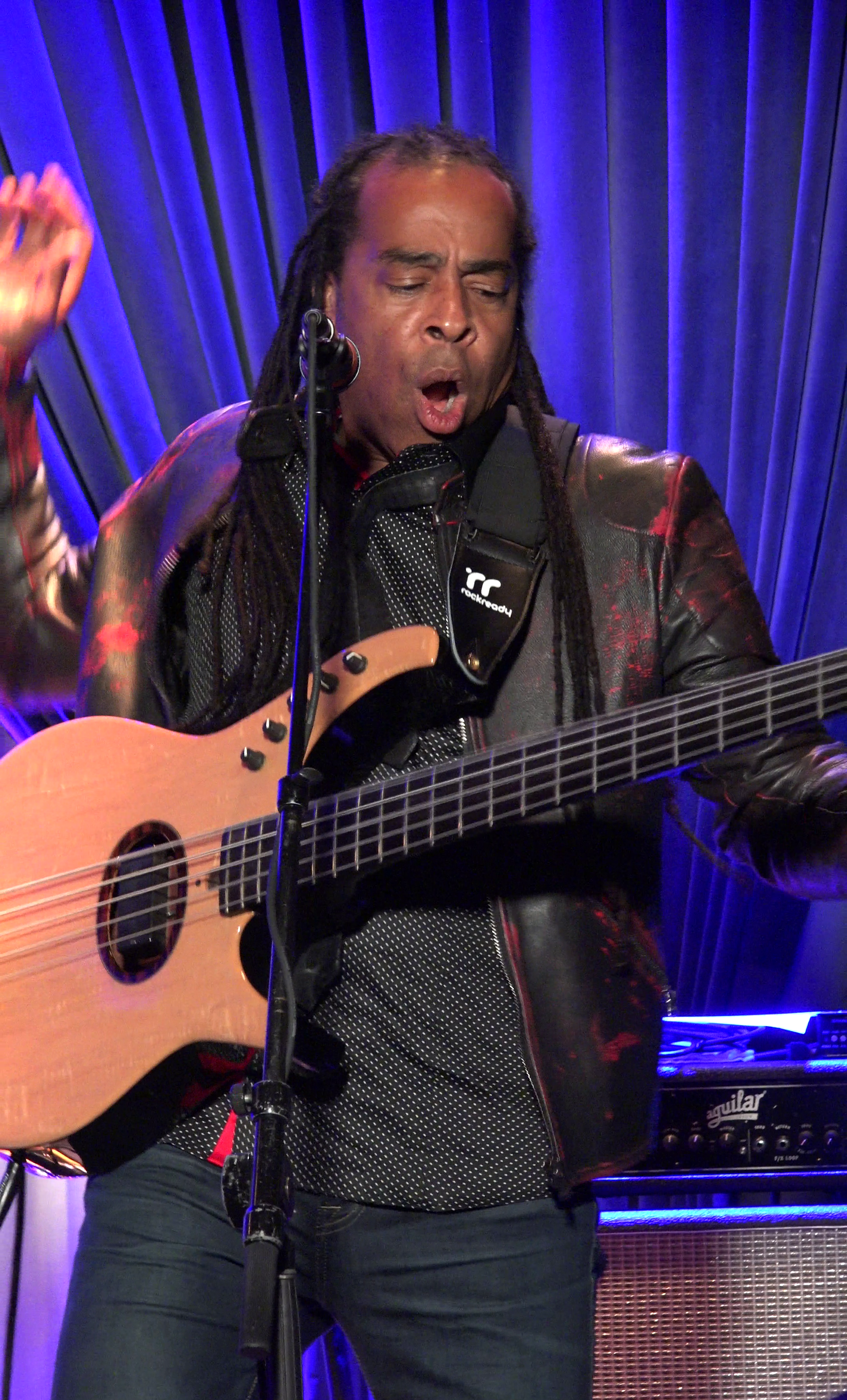
Billy Idol credited bassist Doug Wimbish with contributing to a large number of tracks, despite not being a "core" member of the production.

"Core" personnel

- Billy Idol – vocals, keyboards, programming, swarm camcorder, arrangements
- Mark Younger-Smith – keyboards, programming, guitars, sitars, arrangements
- Robin Hancock – keyboards, programming, arrangements

Additional personnel

- Jamie Muhoberac – keyboards, organ
- Doug Wimbish – bass
- Larry Seymour – bass (10)
- Tal Bergman – drums
- David Weiss – saw (7)
- Robert Farago – spoken words (6)
- Muhammad Ali – excerpts (between 7 & 8)
- London Jo Henwood – sexy voice (6)
- The Shartse Monks – excerpts (13)
- Durga McBroom – backing vocals (17)
- Carnie Wilson – backing vocals (17)
- Wendy Wilson – backing vocals (17)

== Production ==
- Robin Hancock – producer, engineer, mixing
- Ross Donaldson – additional engineer
- Mike Baumgartner –mix assistant
- Ed Korengo – mixing, mix assistant
- A&M Studios (Hollywood, California) – mixing location
- Stephen Marcussen – mastering at Precision Mastering (Hollywood, California)
- Chris Rugolo – band technician
- Henry Marquez – art direction
- Michael Diehl – design
- Billy Idol – cover concept, logo design
- "Sweet" Briar Ludwig – logo design
- Greg Gorman – photography
- Peter Graville – photography
- Brett Leonard – photography
- Elisabeth Sunday – photography
- Gwen Mullen – rendering
- Scott Hampton – rendering

Uncredited

- Gareth Branwyn – consultation, lyrics (Untitled (Opening Manifesto)), text (diskette)
- Mark Frauenfelder – consultation, graphic design (cover art and logo for album, singles, and VHS cassette)
- Timothy Leary – consultation, spoken word (album track No. 15 segue)
- Jaime Levy – interactive producer

== Charts ==
=== Weekly charts ===
Weekly chart performance for Cyberpunk
Chart (1993)	Peak position
Australian Albums (ARIA)	12
Austrian Albums (Ö3 Austria)	5
Canada Top Albums/CDs (RPM)	39
Dutch Albums (Album Top 100)	65
European Albums (Music & Media)	11
Finnish Albums (Suomen virallinen lista)	5
German Albums (Offizielle Top 100)	13
Hungarian Albums (MAHASZ)	18
Italian Albums (Musica e dischi)	21
Norwegian Albums (VG-lista)	19
Swedish Albums (Sverigetopplistan)	11
Swiss Albums (Schweizer Hitparade)	15
UK Albums (Official Charts)	20
US Billboard 200	48

=== Year-end charts ===
Year-end chart performance for Cyberpunk
Chart (1993)	Position
German Albums (Offizielle Top 100)	71

== See also ==
- List of cyberpunk works: Music

Cyberpunk promotion

- Interactive advertising
- Internet marketing
- Social media

== Footnotes ==
I. Cyberpunk was one of the first albums to list the e-mail address of the artist in advertisements and within the album booklet. The address, idol@well.sf.ca.us, is now inactive.
