= Gareth Branwyn =

American writer & media critic (1958-)

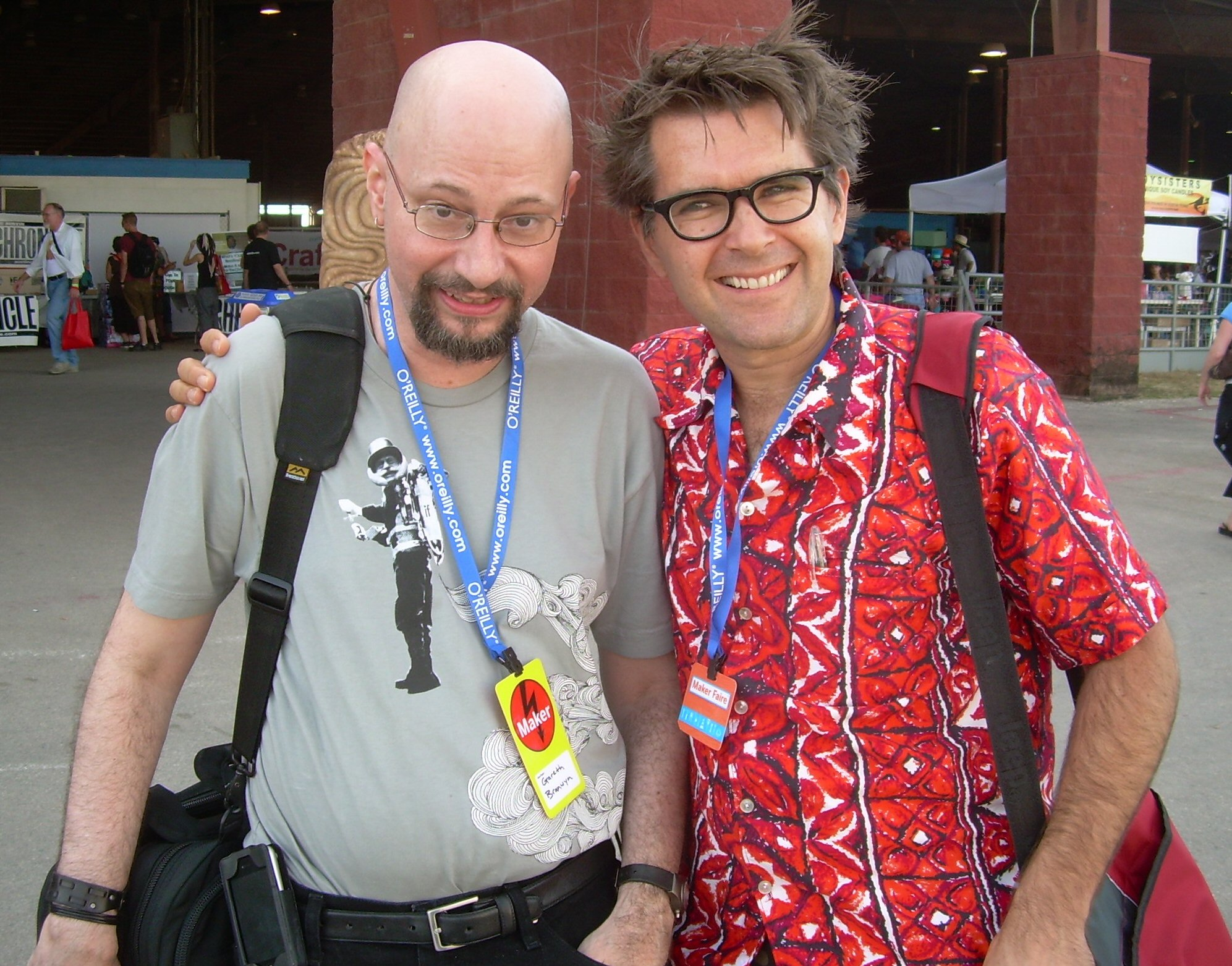
Gareth Branwyn (left) and Mark Frauenfelder at Maker Faire Austin 2007. Photograph by Jon Lebkowsky

Kevin Maloof (born January 21, 1958), better known by his pseudonym, Gareth Branwyn, is a writer, editor, and media critic.

He has covered technology, DIY media, and cyberculture for Wired, Esquire, the Baltimore Sun and other publications. He has also been an editor at Mondo 2000, and at Boing Boing when it was a print zine (he had his own column Going Gaga). He founded the personal tech site, Street Tech, where he was self-described "Cyborg-in-Chief." He is the former editorial director for MAKE Magazine, where he oversaw all content. In April 2013, he returned to freelance writing to begin work on his lazy memoir, Borg Like Me. The book was crowdfunded, via Kickstarter, and self-published. It was finally released on September 2, 2014, on Branwyn's own Sparks of Fire Press. In April, 2014, Branwyn joined Kevin Kelly, Mark Frauenfelder, and Carla Sinclair as a regular contributor to Wink Books, a daily review of art, instructional, graphical, and other "remarkable books that belong on paper."

Branwyn was a co-editor of The Happy Mutant Handbook and is the author of Jargon Watch: A Pocket Dictionary for the Jitterati, Jamming the Media, The Absolute Beginner's Guide to Building Robots and Mosaic Quick Tour: Accessing and Navigating the World Wide Web, one of the first books written about the Web. Along with Boing Boing's Mark Frauenfelder, he was also involved in Billy Idol's controversial 1993 recording Cyberpunk. In the early 1990s, Branwyn published the small-format alternative art and culture zine Going Gaga.

Gareth Branwyn was married to DC-area jazz singer and Thievery Corporation vocalist Pam Bricker, who committed suicide in 2005. They had one child. In 2021 Branwyn married his long-time girlfriend, fine artist and arts educator, Angela White. They live in Benicia, California.
