= Jude Milhon =

American hacker, writer, editor, advocate (1939 - 2003)

Judith Milhon
- Born: March 12, 1939; Washington, D.C., United States
- Died: July 19, 2003 (aged 64)
- Occupations: hacker and author
- Employer(s): Horn and Hardart; senior editor at Mondo 2000, frequent contributor to Boing Boing
- Known for: Coining the term cypherpunk Co-creator of Community Memory; Early contributor to the Berkeley Software Distribution
- Notable work: The Cyberpunk Handbook (1995), How to Mutate and Take Over the World (1996)
- Movement: Founding member of the cypherpunks

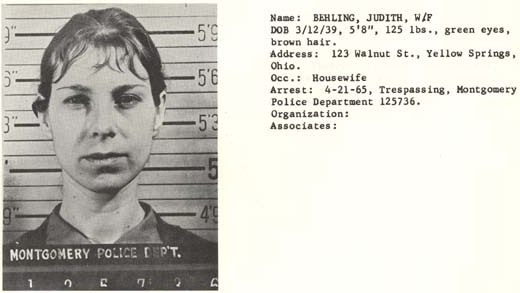
Jude's mugshot from her civil rights days.

Judith Milhon (March 12, 1939 – July 19, 2003), best known by her pseudonym St. Jude, was a self-taught programmer, civil rights advocate, writer, editor, advocate for women in computing, hacker and author in the San Francisco Bay Area.

Milhon coined the term cypherpunk and was a founding member of the cypherpunks. On July 19, 2003, Milhon died of cancer.

== Life ==
Judith Milhon was born March 12, 1939, in Washington, D.C., raised in Indiana, to a military family of the Marine Corps. She married Robert Behling in 1961 and had one daughter, Tresca Behling, with him. Attracted to the growing countercultural movement, Milhon moved near Antioch College in Yellow Springs, Ohio, and established a communal household with her husband, young daughter, and friends. In 1968 she moved to San Francisco with her friend and partner Efrem Lipkin and divorced her husband in 1970. At the time of her death in 2003 from cancer, she was survived by at least one child, Tresca Behling, and one grandchild, Emilio Zuniga, as well as her partner of over 40 years, Efrem Lipkin.

== Professional projects ==
Milhon taught herself programming in 1967 and landed her first job at the Horn and Hardart vending machine company of New York before she moved away to California to join the counterculture movement. She worked at the Berkeley Computer Company (an outgrowth of Project Genie), and she helped implement the communications controller of the BCC timesharing system. In 1971 she partnered with other local activists and technologists at Project One, where she was particularly drawn to the Resource One project, with the goal of creating the Bay Area's first public computerized bulletin board system.

In 1973, a subset of the Resource One group, including Milhon, broke away to create Community Memory in Berkeley. Later, she also worked on BSD, a Unix-based operating system developed by the Computer Systems Research Group at UC Berkeley. In the late 1990s, Milhon worked in Oakland as a web designer and consultant for internet start-ups.

She was a member of Computer Professionals for Social Responsibility, and the author of several books. She was a senior editor at the magazine Mondo 2000 and frequent contributor to Boing Boing.

=== Bibliography ===
- The Joy of Hacker Sex (proposed)
- How to Mutate & Take Over the World: an Exploded Post-Novel (1997) (with R. U. Sirius) Random House ISBN 0-517-19832-0
- Cyberpunk Handbook: The Real Cyberpunk Fakebook (1995) (with R. U. Sirius and Bart Nagel) Random House. ISBN 0-679-76230-2
- Hacking the Wetware: The NerdGirl’s Pillow Book (1994) (internet release of ebook)

== Activism and vision ==
St. Jude had her hand in many different causes. She was active in the 1960s Civil Rights Movement helping to organize the march from Selma to Montgomery, Alabama. Dedicated to protest, Milhon was jailed for trespassing in Montgomery, Alabama as well as for civil disobedience in Jackson, Mississippi.

Activism within the cyber community was important to Milhon as well. She frequently urged women toward the internet and hacking while encouraging them to have "tough skin" in the face of harassment. At a time when the internet was dominated by men, she was an ardent advocate of the joys of hacking, cybersex and a woman's right to technology. She often said, "Girls need modems. Women may not be great at physical altercations, but we sure excel at rapid-fire keyboarding." Milhon once noted that there was a conspicuous lack of female hardware hackers, and while working at Community Memory she worked against this exclusion and worked to get new, inexperienced users to experiment with Community Memory. She did so by writing open-ended questions in the system about available resources in the region (such as “Where can I get a decent bagel in the Bay Area (Berkeley particularly)?”), which would get curious users to try out the system.

She also wrote "The Cyberpunk Handbook" and coined the term "cypherpunk" for computer users dedicated to online privacy through encryption.
