= Adam in Chains =

Single by Billy Idol

from the album Cyberpunk
- Released: 20 September 1993
- Recorded: 1992, Los Angeles, U.S.
- Genre: Electronica; chill-out
- Length: 3:54
- Label: Chrysalis
- Songwriters: Billy Idol, Robin Hancock
- Producer: Robin Hancock

Billy Idol singles chronology
"Shock to the System" (1993)	"Adam in Chains" (1993)	"Wasteland" (1993)

Audio sample
- file; help

"Adam in Chains" is a song by the English rock singer Billy Idol, released on 20 September 1993 as the third single from his fifth studio album, Cyberpunk. The song was written by Idol and Robin Hancock, and was produced by Hancock.

The album version of the song has a duration of over six minutes and is divided into two sections: the first two minutes and fifty-four seconds are of a voice coaxing the listener through a hypnotic exercise, encouraging them towards a state of relaxation. The remainder of the song consists of Idol singing in a melodious, slow tempo. For its release as a single in the UK and Europe, a radio edit of the track was created by Hancock.

== Background ==
Within the biography section of the custom floppy disk included with the press pack edition of the Cyberpunk album, the song was described by Mark Frauenfelder:

"Here's a prayer for the tomorrow people and power junkies. Can we find the door to our inner self and challenge our spiritual demons? Can new technologies, such as VR and brainwave entertainment devices become new channels for self-realization?"

In a 1993 interview, Mark Younger-Smith, who played keyboards and guitar on the Cyberpunk album, commented on the song's origins: "The more techno-y and intense songs like 'Heroin,' 'Adam in Chains,' and 'Venus,' started out as a sequenced track laden with keyboards. First we'd set a mood, then Billy would create a lyric."

Aside from the song's music video, Idol also performed the song live on The Arsenio Hall Show in July 1993, along with the Cyberpunk track "Wasteland".

== Music video ==
A music video for "Adam in Chains" was directed by Julien Temple. It depicted Billy Idol bound in a chair with a chip inserted into his neck as he is monitored by scientists. He struggles before being hypnotized, and is then inserted into a virtual reality simulator. There he is treated to an ethereal water fantasy. Idol eventually rejects the fantasy, which is consumed in flames as, in the real world, his body violently convulses. The scientists end the experiment and Idol is brought back into reality, only to fall unconscious. There was also a shorter version of the video featuring an edited intro and female backing vocals, using different shots than the full-length video.

== Critical reception ==
Musician, in a 1993 issue, described the song as "New Age lull". Robert Christgau, in his review of Cyberpunk, commented: "So "Adam in Chains," which after a long spoken intro devolves into what a vulgarian might take for his latest love-gone-bad rant, is in fact "a prayer for the tomorrow people and power junkies."" AXS.com later featured the song as one of Idol's "five most underrated songs" in a retrospective look back over Idol's recording career. Writer Kareem Gantt felt the song was a "gem" from a "subpar" album and commented: "It's a weird song, for sure, but it's a single that you won't be able to pull from once you hear it."

== Formats and track listings ==
European CD single

1. "Adam in Chains" (Edit) - 3:46
2. "Adam in Chains" (Album Version) - 6:23

Netherlands CD maxi-single

1. "Adam in Chains" (Edit) - 3:46
2. "Adam in Chains" (Album Version) - 6:23
3. "Venus" - 5:45
4. "Heroin" (Needle Park Mix) - 5:12

UK CD single #2

1. "Adam in Chains" (Album Version) - 6:23
2. "Tomorrow People" - 5:04
3. "Mony Mony" - 4:00

== Chart performance ==
The track failed to chart in the UK, however it did chart in France at No. 5 and Poland at No. 35.

== Personnel ==
- Billy Idol - vocals, keyboards, programming, arranger
- Mark Younger-Smith - guitars, keyboards, programming, arranger
- Robin Hancock - producer, arrangement, mixing, engineer, programming, keyboards
- Doug Wimbish - bass
- Tal Bergman - drums
- Robert Farago - spoken vocals
- Jo Henwood - backing vocals
- Ross Donaldson - additional engineering
- Ed Korengo, Mike Baumgartner - assistant mixers
- Stephen Marcussen - mastering
