= S/n =

S/n, S/N or s/n may refer to:

- Signal-to-noise ratio, a measure in science and engineering
- Screen name (computing), of a computer user
- Serial number, a unique identifier

== See also ==
- SN (disambiguation)
- Signal-to-noise (disambiguation)
