= Gracie and Zarkov =

Gracie and Zarkov were pseudonymous writers who documented their use of dimethyltryptamine and other psychedelic tryptamines and phenethylamines. Their experiences were documented in self-published papers, as Notes from Underground, and in articles published in outlets such as Mondo 2000, starting from ca 1980s. According to Sisters of the Extreme: Women Writing on the Drug Experience, Gracie's name was chosen in homage to Gracie Allen, Grace Slick, and the "gratuitous grace" that Aldous Huxley found in the psychedelic experience. Zarkov is a likely reference to the fictional professor Hans Zarkov from Flash Gordon.
