= Craft (American magazine) =

Craft: (transforming traditional crafts)
- Editor: Carla Sinclair
- Categories: Do it yourself (DIY)
- Frequency: Quarterly
- First issue: April 2006
- Final issue: 2009
- Company: O'Reilly Media
- Country: United States
- Language: English
- Website: www.craftzine.com
- ISSN: 1932-9121

Craft: (or CRAFT:) was a quarterly magazine published by O'Reilly Media which focused on do it yourself (DIY) projects involving knitting, sewing, jewelry, metalworking, woodworking, and other disciplines. The magazine was marketed to people who enjoy "crafting" things and features projects which can often be completed with cheap materials, including household items. The magazine was in circulation between 2006 and 2009.

== Subjects ==
Unlike more traditional craft magazines and how-to books, Craft: projects were aimed at a younger (18-35) audience. Projects in the first issue included making a stitched robot doll, a silver-thread and microprocessor-based programmable LED tank top, knit slouch boots, a minimalist 'catnip castle,' and an ant-farm room divider. Articles with names like "Subversive Cross Stitch," "Battle Chic - craft a wardrobe of medieval armor with DIY chainmail," and "The Lost Ipu Art of Ni‘ihau" are typical of the magazine's eclectic indie themes.

== Demographic ==
Craft: was aimed at the emerging DIY culture in North America and Europe, particularly female, that enjoys not only the fashion of handmade items and crafts, but also the philosophy and politics inherent in recycling, DIY clothing, and ecology. The ads featured in Craft: targeted a readership that is largely liberal, and interested in locally produced, handmade, ecological, and organic goods and craft supplies. The demographic also is heavily computer literate, and blogs about their crafts and the crafts of their peers, thus ads for services such as web hosting and flickr were also found in the magazine's pages.

== Cancellation of the print version ==
On 11 February 2009, e-mails were sent to Craft: subscribers explaining that due to rising production costs and shrinking ad markets, the print version of Craft: would be discontinued but would remain as an online presence. Also, all further printed content would be incorporated into Make:. The website for Craft: included the following announcement from publisher Dale Dougherty:

"All along, we have noticed that Craftzine.com has been growing steadily. At the same time, we've come to realize that there were more and more challenges in publishing CRAFT as a print magazine, especially with the costs of print and distribution rising, and diminishing interest among advertisers in print. So we've decided that Volume 10, our Celebrate Like Crazy issue, will be our last print issue and that the future of CRAFT is online."

"Creating a print magazine was a great pleasure for all of us on our amazing team, and we've appreciated the many readers who told us how much they enjoyed CRAFT. Our print magazine helped to gain recognition that craft is thriving today, more than ever. We're going online exclusively with CRAFT because that's where we can best reach and serve our audience."

"I also want to assure you that craft and crafters will continue to be an important part of the program for Maker Faire. We have always regarded crafters as we do makers, a creative vanguard who are remaking the world in ways that are especially vital today. Also, we will continue to publish MAKE magazine in print. The closure of CRAFT in print allows us to focus our limited resources on growing a single DIY magazine instead of two."

Under the "Craft Print FAQ", he added the following:

"The CRAFT site will grow to combine its current blog style plus more original content including weekly and bimonthly columns, and tutorials. We hope you'll stick with us and visit often!"
