= David Pescovitz =

American journalist

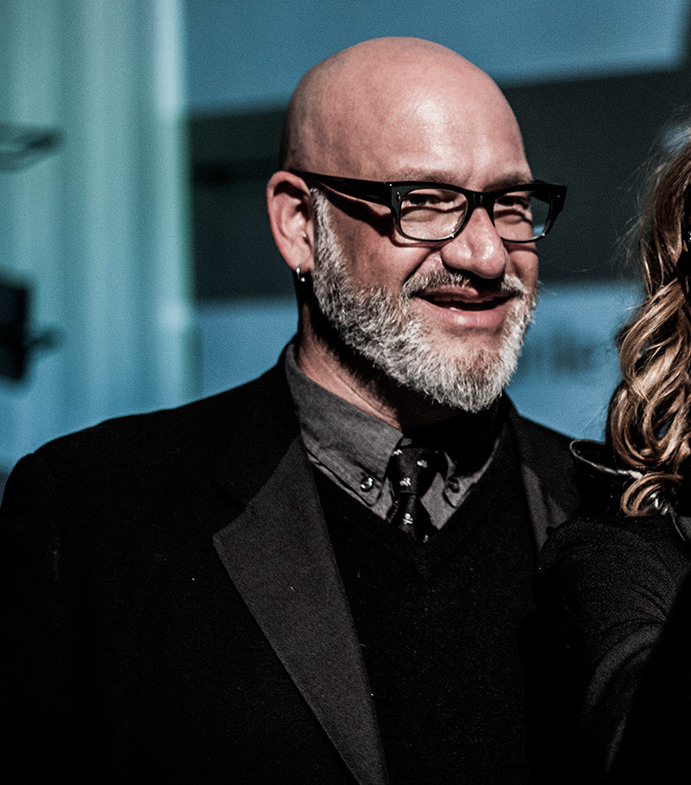
David Pescovitz, 2014

David Pescovitz is partner and co-editor of Boing Boing, a technology and culture Web magazine, and vice president of communications and content at ICONIQ Capital, a global investment firm. In 2018 he won a Grammy Award for Best Boxed or Special Limited Edition Package for co-producing The Voyager Golden Record: 40th Anniversary Edition, the first vinyl release of the interstellar message for extraterrestrials.

Pescovitz is co-founder of Ozma Records, a music label and publisher. Pescovitz was a research director at Institute for the Future, a nonprofit think tank in Silicon Valley, and still serves as a research affiliate. Pescovitz co-wrote the book Reality Check, based on his column in Wired magazine.

From 2000 to 2007 Pescovitz was the first ever writer-in-residence at UC Berkeley's College of Engineering. He has also contributed to the New York Times, Los Angeles Times, Scientific American, Bloomberg Businessweek, MTV, and Encyclopædia Britannica. His writings on technology and culture are featured in the books What Are You Optimistic About?: Today's Leading Thinkers on Why Things Are Good and Getting Better, Dissident Futures, The Happy Mutant Handbook, and The 'Zine Reader.

Pescovitz holds a Bachelor of Fine Arts in Electronic Media from the University of Cincinnati and a Master's in Journalism from UC Berkeley.
