= Rob Beschizza =

American writer, artist and journalist

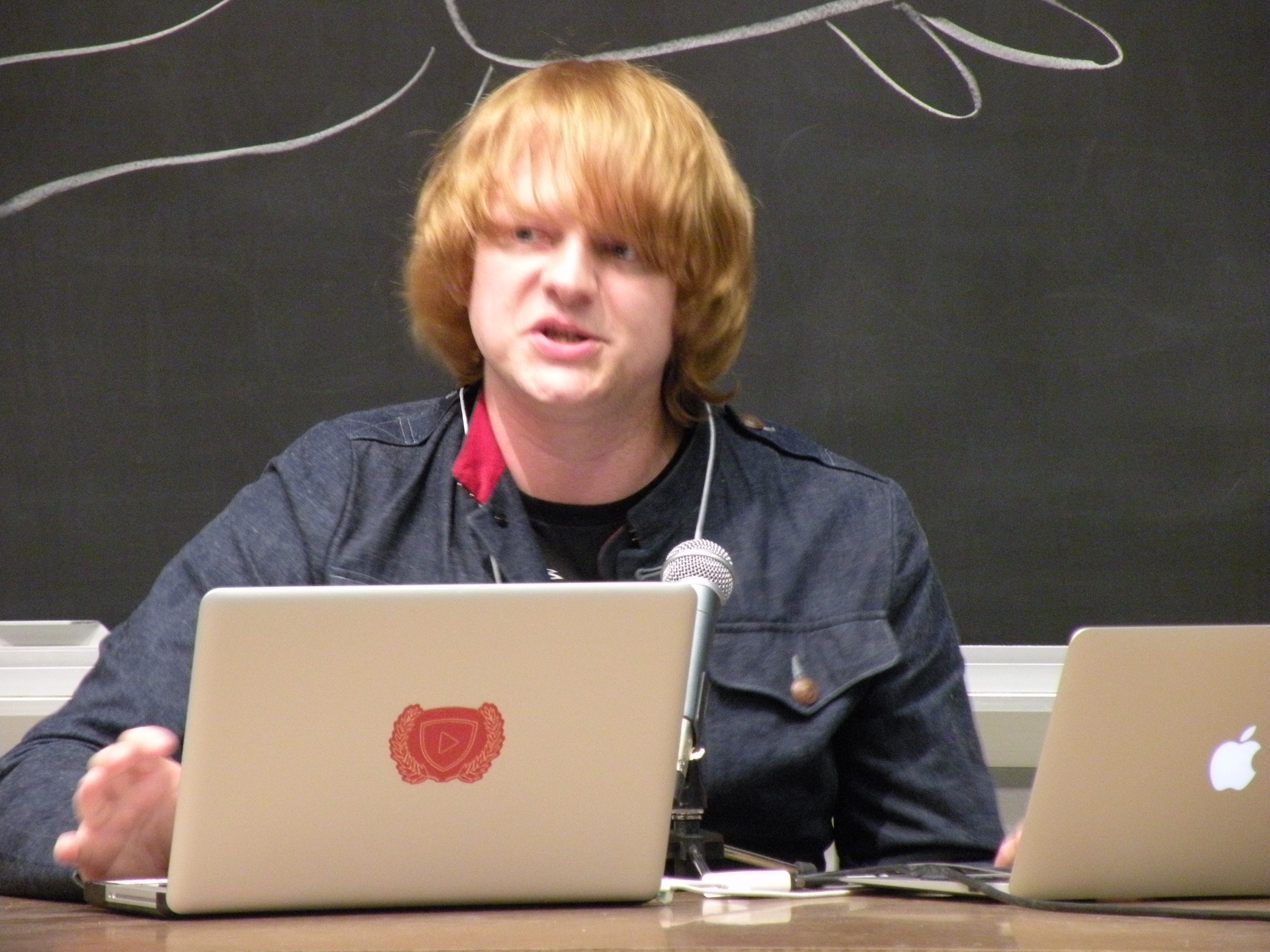
- Rob Beschizza at ROFLcon III in 2012
- Education: Goldsmiths College
- Occupation: Writer
- Known for: Boing Boing, txt.fyi
- Spouse: Heather Beschizza

Rob Beschizza is a British-American writer, artist and journalist, the editor of the culture website Boing Boing and the founder of txt.fyi, a publishing platform described by Wired as an example of "antisocial media". His works include minimalist video games, short stories, generative software that produces psychedelic art, wine descriptions, and journalistic euphemisms, among other subjects. Beschizza has appeared as a news commentator on television networks including NBC, CNN and Al Jazeera.

Beschizza, formerly a technology correspondent and a crime reporter, is a graduate of Goldsmiths College and became a naturalized US citizen in 2015.

In 2014, Beschizza produced an unauthorized edit of David Lynch's 1984 motion picture Dune with the dialogue systematically removed, which was itself taken down after a copyright claim.
