= SN =

SN, Sn, sn, .sn, or s.n. may refer to:

== Businesses and organizations ==
- Brussels Airlines (IATA code: SN)
  - Sabena
  - SN Brussels Airlines (IATA code: SN)
- Servant of the People (Sluha Narodu), political party in Ukraine
- Slovaks Forward (Slovaci Napred), a political party in Serbia
- Standards Norway, the main standards organization of Norway
- Stronnictwo Narodowe (National Party), a Polish political party
- Supreme Court of Poland (Sąd Najwyższy), the court of last resort for non-administrative matters
- SharkNinja, NYSE stock ticker symbol

== Places ==
- Senegal (ISO country code SN)
- Shaanxi, a province of China (Guobiao abbreviation SN)
- South Sulawesi, a province of Indonesia (ISO 3166-2:ID code)
- Saxony, a state of Germany
- SN postcode area, the UK postcode district containing Swindon and much of North Wiltshire

== Religion ==
- Samyutta Nikaya or SN, a Buddhist scripture
- Sutta Nipata or Sn, a Buddhist scripture

== Science, technology, and mathematics ==
=== Computing ===
- .sn, the country-code top level domain of Senegal
- sn, the surname attribute of the Lightweight Directory Access Protocol

=== Mathematics ===
- Symmetric group or S_{n}
- n-sphere or S^{n}
- sn (elliptic function), one of Jacobi's elliptic functions
- Sigma notation, also known as a summation

=== Meteorology ===
- SN, METAR code for snow
- Spotter Network, a system for reporting location and severe weather observations of storm spotters and chasers

=== Other uses in science and technology ===
- Savin–Norov machine gun
- Space Network, a NASA relay satellite system
- Stereospecific numbering in compounds such as glycerophospholipids
- Sthène, an obsolete unit of force or thrust in the metre-tonne-second system of units
- Substantia nigra, a brain structure
- Supernova, a stellar explosion, in astronomy and cosmology
- Tin, symbol Sn, a chemical element

== Other uses ==
- Seaman, abbreviation for the United States Navy rank
- Serial number, in component tracking
- Shona language (ISO 639 alpha-2 code "sn")
- Sine nomine or s.n., a Latin term for "without a name"
- Spanish Navy
- Abbreviation for Sportsnet, a Canadian sports specialty channel

== See also ==
- S/n (disambiguation)
- ΣΝ or Sigma Nu, a fraternity
