= Signal to Noise =

Signal to Noise may refer to:

== Science and technology ==
- Signal-to-noise ratio, a measure used in science and engineering to quantify how much a signal has been corrupted by noise
  - Signal-to-noise ratio (imaging), this measure specifically in the field of imaging

== Literature ==
- Signal to Noise (comics), a 1992 graphic novel written by Neil Gaiman and illustrated by Dave McKean
- Signal to Noise, a 1998 cyberpunk novel by Eric S. Nylund
- Signal to Noise (Sinclair novel), a 1997 cyberpunk novel by Carla Sinclair
- Signal to Noise (Moreno-Garcia novel), a 2015 fantasy novel by Silvia Moreno-Garcia

== Music ==
- Signal to Noise (The Rise album), a 2002 album by the band The Rise
- Signal to Noise (White Willow album), a 2006 album by the Norwegian art-rock band White Willow
- "Signal to Noise" (song), a song from Peter Gabriel’s 2002 album Up
- Signal to Noise, a 2015 album by Andy Jackson
- "Signal to Noise", a song included as a B-side from The Cure's single "Cut Here"

== See also ==
- "S2N", a song on the album Distance Over Time from the progressive metal band Dream Theater
