= Heroin (The Velvet Underground song) =

1967 song by the Velvet Underground

Song by the Velvet Underground

from the album The Velvet Underground & Nico
- Released: March 1967
- Recorded: May 1966
- Studio: TTG Studios, Hollywood, California
- Genre: Experimental rock; avant-pop; proto-punk
- Length: 7:12
- Label: Verve
- Songwriter: Lou Reed
- Producer: Andy Warhol

Audio sample
- "Heroin": file; help

"Heroin" is a song by the American rock band the Velvet Underground, released on their 1967 debut album The Velvet Underground & Nico. Written by Lou Reed in 1964, the song, which overtly depicts heroin usage and its effects, is one of the band's most celebrated compositions. Critic Mark Deming of AllMusic writes, "While 'Heroin' hardly endorses drug use, it doesn't clearly condemn it, either, which made it all the more troubling in the eyes of many listeners." In 2004, it was ranked at number 448 on Rolling Stone's list of "The 500 Greatest Songs of All Time", and was re-ranked at number 455 in 2010.

== Writing and recording ==
In an interview with WLIR in 1972, Reed said he wrote the lyrics while working as a songwriter for Pickwick Records, a budget label that mostly released inexpensive sound-alikes.

I was working for a record company as a songwriter, where they'd lock me in a room and they'd say write ten surfing songs, ya know, and I wrote "Heroin" and I said "Hey I got something for ya." They said, "Never gonna happen, never gonna happen."

"Heroin" was one of three songs on The Velvet Underground & Nico (along with "I'm Waiting for the Man" and "Venus in Furs") that were re-recorded at TTG Studios in Hollywood following the initial recording sessions in New York. This recording of the song is the second-longest track on the album, at 7 minutes and 12 seconds long; "European Son" is 30 seconds longer.

"Heroin" begins slowly with Reed's quiet, melodic guitar, Sterling Morrison's rhythm guitar, and drum patterns by Maureen Tucker, soon joined by John Cale's droning electric viola. The tempo increases gradually, until a crescendo, punctuated by bow scratching and feedback from Cale's viola and louder, more regular strumming by Reed and Morrison. Tucker's drumming becomes faster and louder. The song then slows to the original tempo, and repeats the same pattern before ending.

The song is based on a plagal progression of D♭ and G♭ major chords (I and IV in the key of D♭ major). Like the band's later song "Sister Ray", it features no bass guitar part, with both Reed and Morrison playing guitar. In reference to the song's use of only two chords, Rolling Stone remarked that "it doesn't take much to make a great song."

Tucker stopped drumming for several seconds at the 5:17 mark, before re-entering. She explains:

As soon as it got loud and fast, I couldn't hear anything. I couldn't hear anybody, so I stopped, assuming, well, they'll stop too and say "what's the matter, Moe?" [laughs] But nobody stopped. And then, you know, so I came back in.

== Alternative versions ==
=== Pickwick Records, May 1965 ===
The earliest recorded version of "Heroin" was a solo demo by Lou Reed. This demo was recorded in May 1965 while he was working for Pickwick and subsequently mailed to himself. The recording was rediscovered in 2022 by Reed's widow Laurie Anderson.

=== Ludlow Street Loft, July 1965 ===
Another version of "Heroin" was with Lou Reed, Sterling Morrison and John Cale at the band's Ludlow Street loft in July 1965. Unlike versions of songs such as "I'm Waiting for the Man" and "Venus in Furs" from the same session, which sound drastically different from how they would on The Velvet Underground & Nico, this version of "Heroin" is nearly identical to the album version in structure. On the recording, Reed performs the song on an acoustic guitar. This version of the song can be found on the 1995 compilation album Peel Slowly and See.

=== Scepter Studios, April 1966 ===
The original take of "Heroin" that was intended for release on The Velvet Underground & Nico was at Scepter Studios in New York City, April 1966. This version of the song features slightly different lyrics, a faster tempo, and a more contained, less chaotic performance. It is about a minute shorter.

One notable difference in the lyrics is Lou Reed's opening—he sings "I know just where I'm going" rather than "I don't know just where I'm going" as on the final album recording. Reed sometimes sang the earlier lyric while performing the song live.

== Controversy ==
"Heroin" (along with songs like "I'm Waiting for the Man") tied the Velvet Underground with drug use in the media. Some critics accused the band of glorifying drug use. However, members of the band (Reed, in particular) frequently denied any claims that the song was advocating use of the drug. Reed's lyrics, such as they are on the majority of The Velvet Underground & Nico, were more meant to focus on providing an objective description of the topic without taking a moral stance. Critics were not the only ones who misunderstood the song's neutral tone; fans would sometimes approach the band members after a live performance and tell them they "shot up to 'Heroin'", a phenomenon that deeply disturbed Reed. As a result, Reed was somewhat hesitant to play the song with the band through much of the band's later career.

== Billy Idol version ==
"Heroin"

Single by Billy Idol

from the album Cyberpunk
- Released: May 4, 1993 (U.S.)
- Recorded: 1992, Los Angeles
- Genre: Electronic rock; techno
- Label: Chrysalis
- Songwriter: Lou Reed
- Producer: Robin Hancock

Billy Idol singles chronology
"Prodigal Blues" (1990)	"Heroin" (1993)	"Shock to the System" (1993)

Audio sample
- file; help

Billy Idol covered the song on his 1993 album Cyberpunk. His cover interpreted the song as a fast-tempo dance track, which made use of sampling and techno beats. It also included the lyric "Jesus died for somebody's sins, but not mine", from Patti Smith's version of "Gloria". Idol told Cash Box in 1993, "I was listening to some stripped-down rhythm tracks and started singing the lyrics [to "Heroin"] on top of it. It sounded like it really worked. Then I started tossing in the old Patti Smith line as a chorus. It really sounded heavy."

Idol mixed eleven versions of "Heroin", releasing them on various singles with some containing previous hits. Six computer-manipulated mixes were produced for the song's music video. One of these videos was later released on a video with his follow-up single "Shock to the System".

=== Reception ===
Larry Flick, writing for Billboard, described Idol's version as a "clench-toothed reading of the Velvet Underground classic" with the use of Smith's "Gloria" adding a "spooky incantation". He added that while Idol's rock following "may grimace at his rave musings", the artist's "penchant for caustic sounds and frenetic rhythms makes this track ring remarkably true". In contrast, Stephen Thomas Erlewine of AllMusic called it "one of the worst covers ever recorded" in his review of Cyberpunk.

=== Charts ===
Chart (1993)	Peak position
US Billboard Hot Dance Club Play	16

== Other cover versions ==
- The song has been covered by several artists, including Mazzy Star, Human Drama, Echo & the Bunnymen, Roky Erickson, and Third Eye Blind.
- Lou Reed later performed "Heroin" live in his glam rock style, featuring the guitarists Steve Hunter and Dick Wagner. A recording of this arrangement appears on his 1974 live album Rock 'n' Roll Animal.
- Pere Ubu performed "Heroin" live with Peter Laughner on vocals, a recording of which was released on the archival live album The Shape of Things in 2000.

== Personnel ==
- Lou Reed – lead guitar, vocals
- John Cale – electric viola
- Sterling Morrison – rhythm guitar
- Moe Tucker – percussion

== References in popular culture ==
- Denis Johnson's short story collection Jesus' Son, and the film based on it took its title from the lyrics of this song.
- In Irvine Welsh's novel Trainspotting, the central character Mark Renton describes playing the Rock 'n' Roll Animal version of "Heroin" instead of the original as "breaking the junkie's golden rule".
