= Charmed Life (Billy Idol album) =

Studio album by Billy Idol
- Released: 30 April 1990
- Recorded: 1989–1990
- Studios: Lighthouse (Los Angeles, California); Track Record (North Hollywood, California); Oasis (Canoga Park, California); Conway (Hollywood, California)
- Genres: New wave; hard rock
- Length: 54:20
- Label: Chrysalis
- Producer: Keith Forsey

Billy Idol chronology
Idol Songs: 11 of the Best (1988)	Charmed Life (1990)	Cyberpunk (1993)

Singles from Charmed Life
- 1. "Cradle of Love" Released: 16 April 1990; 2. "L.A. Woman" Released: 23 July 1990; 3. "Prodigal Blues" Released: 10 December 1990

Professional ratings
Review scores
Source	Rating
AllMusic	4/5 stars
Billboard	positive
Cash Box	positive
Christgau's Consumer Guide	
NME	8/10
Record Mirror	4/5 stars
Rolling Stone	4/5 stars
Smash Hits	5/10 stars
Tom Hull	B

Charmed Life is the fourth studio album by the English rock musician Billy Idol, released on 30 April 1990 by Chrysalis Records. Like its predecessor, Whiplash Smile (1986), the album shows a more emotional side of Idol, but with a more organic and less technologically-dependent sound. Primarily a new wave and hard rock album, Charmed Life also experiments with other genres, such as jazz on "Endless Sleep" and electro-blues on "Trouble With The Sweet Stuff."

== Background ==
"The album is about how great life is and how bad it is just to throw it away, which I almost did."

— Billy Idol discussing the album's theme.

Unlike Idol's previous three albums, Charmed Life did not feature guitarist Steve Stevens, and most of the guitar work was handled by Mark Younger-Smith instead. Idol told Sounds in 1990, "Meeting Mark Younger-Smith gave me a lynchpin, someone I could work with by forming a sound and an idea for this album." Idol finished sessions for the album on 5 February 1990. During the following morning, after picking up the final mixes from Conway Studios, he was seriously injured in a motorcycle accident.

"Love Unchained" was inspired by a friend of Idol's who died in a motorcycle accident.

== Release ==
The lead single, "Cradle of Love", appeared on the soundtrack of The Adventures of Ford Fairlane. The song was famous for its video, which won the 1990 MTV Video Music Award for "Best video from a film". The video directed by David Fincher, involved Betsy Lynn George as a teenager who knocks at her neighbour's door and asks to play a tape, before stripping to the music. The album's second single is a cover version of "L.A. Woman" by The Doors. Its video was also directed by Fincher. The third single off the album was "Prodigal Blues".

Charmed Life was certified Platinum by the Recording Industry Association of America (RIAA) and Silver by the British Phonographic Industry (BPI) in 1990.

== Track listing ==
No.	Title	Writer(s)	Length
1.	"The Loveless"	Billy Idol, Mark Younger-Smith	4:17
2.	"Pumping on Steel"	Idol, Younger-Smith	4:41
3.	"Prodigal Blues"	Idol	5:41
4.	"L.A. Woman"	John Densmore, Robbie Krieger, Ray Manzarek, Jim Morrison	5:29
5.	"Trouble With the Sweet Stuff"	Idol, Keith Forsey, Younger-Smith, Dave Concors	5:58
6.	"Cradle of Love"	David Werner, Idol	4:40
7.	"Mark of Caine"	Idol	4:31
8.	"Endless Sleep"	Dolores Nance, Jody Reynolds	3:12
9.	"Love Unchained"	Idol	4:39
10.	"The Right Way"	Idol	5:03
11.	"License to Thrill"	Idol, Forsey	6:01

== Personnel ==
- Billy Idol – vocals, acoustic guitar (3, 7), arrangements, horn arrangements (11)
- Greg Mathieson – keyboards (1)
- John Philip Shenale – programming (2), additional bass (2)
- Arthur Barrow – keyboards (3, 4, 6–9), programming (6, 11), additional bass (6), bass (8, 11)
- Mark Younger-Smith – guitars, bass (2)
- Jimmy Johnson – bass (1)
- Phil Soussan – bass (3, 10), additional bass (11)
- Vito – bass (4, 5, 6, 9)
- Randy Jackson – bass (7)
- Keith Forsey – drums (1, 2, 3, 5–9), percussion (11), arrangements
- Mike Baird – drums (3, 4, 10, 11), programming (11), drum programming (11)
- Alex Brown – backing vocals (3, 5)
- Bunny Hull – backing vocals (3, 5)
- Stephanie Spruill – backing vocals (3, 5)
- The P.L.S. Singers – backing vocals (11)

Handclaps on "The Right Way"

- The "Rude Dudes" (John Diaz, Keith Forsey, Billy Idol, Art Natoli and Mark Younger-Smith)

=== Production ===
- Keith Forsey – producer
- Tommy Vicari – mixing, engineer (1, 6, 8, 9)
- Dave Concors – engineer (2–5, 7, 10, 11)
- Kevin Becka – assistant engineer (1)
- Bryan Carlstrom – assistant engineer (2, 3, 5, 7, 10, 11)
- Ken Paulakovich – second engineer (5)
- Ian Minns – assistant engineer (6)
- Craig Porteils – mix assistant (1, 6), assistant engineer (6)
- Paul Wertheimer – mix assistant (2, 10)
- Bryant Arnett – mix assistant (3, 4, 5, 7, 8, 9, 11), assistant engineer (4, 6, 8, 9)
- Bernie Grundman – mastering (1–5, 7–11)
- George Marino – mastering (6)
- AWest – art direction, cover design, cover illustration
- Brass Ring Circus Studio – art direction
- Billy Idol – cover design
- Max Aguilera-Hellweg – photography
- Art Natoli – personal assistant

Studios

- Recorded at Lighthouse Studios (Los Angeles, California); Track Record Studios and Oasis Recording Studios (North Hollywood, California ); Conway Studios (Hollywood, California).
- Mixed at Record Plant (Los Angeles, California) and Conway Studios
- Tracks 1–5 & 7–11 mastered at Bernie Grundman Mastering (Hollywood, California).
- Track 6 mastered at Sterling Sound (New York City, New York).

== Charts ==
=== Weekly charts ===
Weekly chart performance for Charmed Life
Chart (1990)	Peak position
Australian Albums (ARIA)	11
Austrian Albums (Ö3 Austria)	11
Canada Top Albums/CDs (RPM)	5
Dutch Albums (Album Top 100)	46
European Albums (Music & Media)	8
Finnish Albums (Suomen virallinen lista)	1
German Albums (Offizielle Top 100)	5
Icelandic Albums (Tónlist)	6
Italian Albums (Musica e dischi)	17
New Zealand Albums (RMNZ)	3
Norwegian Albums (VG-lista)	5
Swedish Albums (Sverigetopplistan)	6
Swiss Albums (Schweizer Hitparade)	4
UK Albums (Official Charts)	15
US Billboard 200	11
US AOR Albums (Radio & Records)	1

=== Year-end charts ===
Year-end chart performance for Charmed Life
Chart (1990)	Position
Canada Top Albums/CDs (RPM)	33
European Albums (Music & Media)	61
German Albums (Offizielle Top 100)	47
US Billboard 200	49

== Certifications ==
Certifications for Charmed Life
Region	Certification	Certified units/sales
Australia (ARIA)	Gold	35,000^{^}
Canada (Music Canada)	Platinum	100,000^{^}
Germany (BVMI)	Gold	250,000^{^}
United Kingdom (BPI)	Silver	60,000^{^}
United States (RIAA)	Platinum	1,000,000^{^}
^{^} Shipments figures based on certification alone.

== See also ==
- List of most expensive albums
