= Jaime Levy =

American multimedia artist, interface designer and user experience strategist

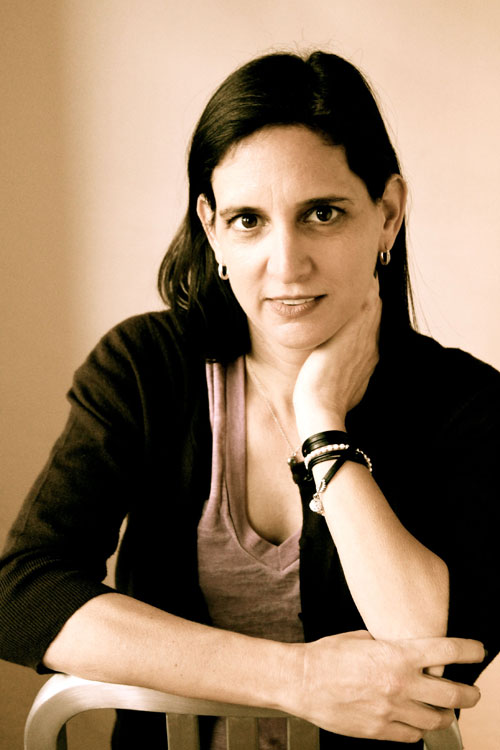
- Born: March 8, 1966 (age 60); Hollywood, California
- Education: New York University; San Francisco State University
- Known for: Information technology and software design pioneer and consultant.
- Website: JaimeLevy.com

Jaime Levy is an American author, new media artist, interface designer, and user experience strategist. She first became known for her new media projects in the 1990s. Her best-known projects include the floppy disk distributed with Billy Idol’s album Cyberpunk, WORD, an online magazine, and an online cartoon series, CyberSlacker. She is the author of the business book UX Strategy, which was first published by O’Reilly Media in 2015. It is widely regarded as the definitive work on the practice of user experience strategy and has been translated into nine languages.

== Background ==
Levy was born on March 8, 1966, in Hollywood, California, and raised in the San Fernando Valley. In 1988, she graduated with a B.A. from San Francisco State University. In 1990, she earned her master's degree from the Interactive Telecommunications Program (ITP) at New York University’s Tisch School of the Arts where she later spent seven years as a part-time professor. She later taught graduate level courses on UX design and strategy for six years at the University of Southern California (USC) in the Viterbi School of Engineering.

== Career ==
Levy's career began in 1990 with the creation of the electronic magazines Cyber Rag and Electronic Hollywood. They were programmed in HyperCard and Macromedia Director and distributed on 800k floppy disks. She leveraged her publicity from numerous print publications and tv to increase the sales of these disks in book stores and mail-order.

In 1993, she worked with EMI Records where she designed, animated, and programmed the first commercially released interactive press kit (IPK) for Billy Idol’s Cyberpunk CD digipack. The project featured sequenced samples, digitized video, hypertext, and interactive animation all integrated together as a seamless experience. She followed that up with the animated electronic book, Ambulance, that was written by Monica Moran and included music by Mike Watt from the band Minutemen and art by Jaime Hernandez of Love and Rockets.

In 1994 while employed by IBM as an interface designer, she began hosting "CyberSlacker" salons for programmers and animators at her East Village, Manhattan loft. By 1995, she took a creative director position at Icon CMT, where she could focus on the creation of the online magazine WORD. It received national recognition for its design and cutting-edge non-linear storytelling. She was recognized as Newsweek’s top 50 people to watch in cyberspace and on Good Morning America as one of "The Most Powerful Twentysomethings in America."

At the beginning of the dot-com era, Levy became an independent consultant. In 1996, she designed a graphical multi-user environment called Malice Palace using The Palace software. Set in a post-apocalyptic San Francisco, users could engage in real-time chat and interact with robots depicted as homeless people.

In 1997, her Silicon Alley-based start-up called Electronic Hollywood received an angel investment. For the next 5-years her company focused on web design, interactive advertising, and original content development. The most prestigious production was the CyberSlacker, Flash cartoon series, which won the Flash Animation Award. She appeared in Doug Block’s 1999 documentary film Home Page and her story was chronicled in the book Gig.

Following the dot-com bubble burst, she shuttered Electronic Hollywood and returned to Los Angeles. From 2002 to the present she has resurfaced as a university professor, author, and user experience design strategist. In 2010, she founded her second company Jaime Levy Consulting (formerly JLR Interactive).

== Bibliography ==
=== Books ===
- 2021. UX Strategy (second edition): Product Strategy Techniques for Divising Innovative Digital Products
- 2015. UX Strategy: How to Devise Innovative Digital Products that People Want ISBN 978-1449372866

Levy has also published the following white papers and articles:

- Imagining the YouTube Model for Interactive Television. (2007). In Lugmayr, A., & Golebiowski (Eds.) Interactive TV: A Shared Experience TICSP Adjunct Proceedings of EuroITV 2007. (p. 270-274). Amsterdam, Netherlands: Tampere International Center for Signal Processing.
- Six Weeks at the Smut Factory: Inside an Adult DVD Authorizing House. (2003, October). Medialine Magazine, p. 40-41.
- The Small World of Games on DVD: Video. (2004, February). Medialine Magazine, p. 34-35.
- Studio Pro vs. Scenarist: Is DVD Authorizing Destined for the Desktop? (2004, May). Medialine Magazine, p. 34-36.
