= Mondo 2000 =

Culture Magazine

- Issue 14 cover
- Editor: R. U. Sirius
- Editor: Jude Milhon
- Editor: Alison Bailey Kennedy
- Publisher: Fun City MegaMedia
- First issue: 1984
- Final issue Number: 1998; 17
- Country: United States
- Based in: Berkeley, California
- Language: English

Mondo 2000 was a glossy cyberculture magazine published in California during the 1980s and 1990s. It covered cyberpunk topics such as virtual reality and smart drugs. It was a more anarchic and subversive prototype for the later-founded Wired magazine.

== History ==
Mondo 2000 originated as High Frontiers in 1984, edited by R. U. Sirius (pseudonym for Ken Goffman) with co-editor and publisher Morgan Russell. R. U. Sirius was succeeded as Editor-in-Chief by Alison Bailey Kennedy, a.k.a. "Queen Mu" and "Alison Wonderland".

Sirius was joined by hacker Jude Milhon (a.k.a. St. Jude) as editor and the magazine was renamed Reality Hackers in 1988 to better reflect its drugs and computers theme. It changed title again to Mondo 2000 in 1989. Art director and photographer Bart Nagel, a pioneer in Photoshop collage, created the publication's elegantly surrealist aesthetic. R. U. Sirius left at the beginning of 1993, at about the same time as the launch of Wired. The magazine continued until 1998, with the last issue being #17.

Mondo 2000 was relaunched as the blog Mondo2000.com in August 2017 and went offline in 2025.

== Featured writers ==
Along with the print version of Boing Boing — with which Mondo 2000 shared several writers, including Mark Frauenfelder, Richard Kadrey, Gareth Branwyn, and Jon Lebkowsky — Mondo 2000 helped develop what was to become the cyberpunk subculture. Writers included William Gibson, Nan C. Druid (pseudonym for Maerian Morris), Paco Nathan, Rudy Rucker, Bruce Sterling, Tiffany Lee Brown, Andrew Hultkrans, Mark Dery, Douglas Rushkoff, Mark Pesce, and Robert Anton Wilson.

Writers contributing since the 2017 relaunch include John Higgs, John Shirley, Giulio Prisco, Hyun Yi Kang, Woody Evans, Michael Pinchera, Rudy Rucker, Prop Anon, R.U. Sirius, and interviews with Douglas Rushkoff and Grant Morrison.

== Publications ==
- Mondo 2000: A User's Guide to the New Edge Rudy Rucker, R.U. Sirius, Queen Mu (ISBN 0-06-096928-8)

== See also ==
- Gracie and Zarkov
- Kenneth Newby
- Wet (magazine)
- Wired (magazine)
