= Prodigal Blues =

Single by Billy Idol

from the album Charmed Life
- B-side: "The Loveless"
- Released: 10 December 1990
- Genre: Blues rock
- Label: Chrysalis
- Songwriter: Billy Idol
- Producer: Keith Forsey

Billy Idol singles chronology
"L.A. Woman" (1990)	"Prodigal Blues" (1990)	"Heroin" (1993)

"Prodigal Blues" is a song by the English rock singer Billy Idol from his fourth studio album Charmed Life (1990). It was also released as the album's third and final single in December 1990.

== Background and writing ==
The song was written by Billy Idol. Speaking of its message, he told Sounds in 1990, "It's my father talking to me and me talking to [my son] Willem. By being angry, mad and crazy at times, I've shouted for an answer and all I've got back was my own echo. What I'm saying to Willem is what my father said to me – everybody has to leave the security of things they love to find out what they're all about. But you don't necessarily have to destroy yourself to do it.

== Charts ==
Chart (1990–1991)	Peak position
Australian (ARIA Charts)	109
UK Singles (OCC)	47
US Mainstream Rock (Billboard)	35
