= Shock to the System (Billy Idol song) =

1993 single by Billy Idol

Single by Billy Idol

from the album Cyberpunk
- Released: 8 June 1993
- Genre: Synth-punk
- Length: 3:33
- Label: Chrysalis
- Songwriters: Billy Idol; Mark Younger-Smith
- Producer: Robin Hancock

Billy Idol singles chronology
| "Heroin" (1993) | "Shock to the System" (1993) | "Adam in Chains" (1993) |

Audio sample
- file; help

Music video
- "Shock to the System" on YouTube

Alternative cover
- UK double CD-single

"Shock to the System" is a single by the English rock singer Billy Idol, released to promote his fifth album, Cyberpunk (1993). Released in June 1993 by Chrysalis Records, it became a top-40 hit in six countries, including Idol's native United Kingdom, but did not make it onto the US Billboard Hot 100.

The song was inspired by the 1992 Los Angeles riots. The accompanying music video, set in a dystopian future, features a man who becomes a cyborg after witnessing Cyber-cops brutally beating another individual. Idol aimed to capture the political and economic conflict of the LA Riots, using the camcorder as a metaphor for technology in rebellion. The video, which used special effects supervised by Stan Winston, was nominated for two MTV Video Music Awards in 1993. The song and video have been analyzed for their themes of racial, sexual, and physical trauma. Several singles of the song were released worldwide, featuring various remixes and additional tracks.

== Conception ==
Idol explained for MTV News, that he had originally created the song with an entirely different set of lyrics, but upon witnessing the Los Angeles riots of 1992 on television, he immediately rewrote and recorded them that day. Speaking to Melody Maker in 1993, Idol commented,

"Of course there's an element of 'Wow!' to it. The three-quarters of people in L.A. who don't live in Beverly Hills saw one of their number being crapped on by the police and an all-white jury in an all-white neighbourhood. They weren't gonna take it anymore and they actually did something about it. And, of course, no matter how people feel about it now, there was an element of glee when you saw some guy running off with a pair of Nike sneakers he'd only ever dreamed of having. There was a lot of sides to what was going on. There was police, civil corruption, fear, race, rape and revolution. And there was a man who would be King. And we tried to get it all in the song."

== Critical reception ==
Upon its release as a single, Terry Staunton of NME described "Shock to the System" as being "essentially 'White Wedding' for the Terminator 2 generation" and noted the "embarrassing lyrics". Both the video and song were heavily analyzed for the overtones of racial, sexual, and physical trauma presented within them by Thomas Foster, associate professor at Indiana University, in his 2005 book, The Souls of Cyberfolk. "Shock to the System" was ranked one of the best synth-punk songs and examples of the cyberpunk subculture by Gonzaï.

== Music video ==
A music video was created for the song, and was set in a dystopian future controlled by Cyber-cops (referred to as such by director Brett Leonard). It depicted an individual who records the Cyber-cops beating a man, only to be noticed and attacked himself. His camera is destroyed and the Cyber-cops leave him unconscious on the ground, as they are busy trying to put down a riot elsewhere in the city. Alone, his camera equipment lands on him and is absorbed into his body, causing him to dramatically morph into a cyborg. The cyborg then joins the riot, leading the rebels to victory.

Idol explained that he was trying to capture the political and economic conflict that had created the LA Riots, and that the camcorder – as displayed in the witnessing of the Rodney King beating – was a "potent way of conveying ideas" and an important metaphor for technology used in rebellion.

The make-up effects were achieved through stop motion, with Billy Idol moving in slow stages during points of the filming. Stan Winston, who had previously worked on the Terminator series and Jurassic Park, supervised and created the special effects for the video. The music video for "Shock to the System" was nominated for "Best Special Effects in a Video" and "Best Editing in a Video" at the 1993 MTV Video Music Awards, losing both times to Peter Gabriel's video for "Steam".

The video was later released on NTSC VHS along with a making-of documentary and a remix, as well as a video for Idol's previous single "Heroin".

== Track listings ==
Several singles for "Shock to the System" were released to various countries. Several included various remixes of "Heroin", a cover of The Velvet Underground's song of the same name, composed and written by Lou Reed. The cover of "Heroin" also included the lyric "Jesus died for somebody's sins/But not mine", written by Patti Smith for her cover of "Gloria". The Australian, Japanese, Dutch, and US releases included the track "Aftershock", which was not included in the Cyberpunk CD.

Australian and Dutch release
| No. | Title | Lyrics | Length |
|---|---|---|---|
| 1. | "Shock to the System" | Idol | 3:33 |
| 2. | "Aftershock" | | 4:45 |
| 3. | "Heroin" (Don't Touch That Needle Mix) | | 5:10 |
| 4. | "Heroin" (Durga Trance Dub) | | 5:10 |
| Total length: | | | 17:78 |

Japanese release
| No. | Title | Lyrics | Length |
|---|---|---|---|
| 1. | "Shock to the System" | Idol | 3:33 |
| 2. | "Aftershock" | | 4:45 |
| 3. | "Heroin" (A Drug Called Horse Mix) | | 7:19 |
| Total length: | | | 22:40 |

UK double CD release

Disc 1
| No. | Title | Lyrics | Length |
|---|---|---|---|
| 1. | "Shock to the System" | Idol | 3:33 |
| 2. | "Heroin" (Album version) | | 6:59 |
| 3. | "Rebel Yell" (edit) | | 3:50 |
| Total length: | | | 14:22 |

Disc 2
| No. | Title | Lyrics | Length |
|---|---|---|---|
| 1. | "Shock to the System" | Idol | 3:33 |
| 2. | "Heroin" (Smack Attack mix) | | 6:59 |
| 3. | "White Wedding" (edit) | | 3:30 |
| Total length: | | | 14:02 |

US release
| No. | Title | Lyrics | Length |
|---|---|---|---|
| 1. | "Shock to the System" | Idol | 3:33 |
| 2. | "Aftershock" | | 4:45 |
| 3. | "Heroin" (A Drug Called Horse mix) | | 7:19 |
| 4. | "Heroin" (Ionizer mix) | | 7:03 |
| Total length: | | | 22:40 |

== Charts ==
Weekly chart performance for "Shock to the System"
| Chart (1993) | Peak position |
|---|---|
| Australia (ARIA) | 28 |
| Canada Top Singles (RPM) | 42 |
| Europe (Eurochart Hot 100) | 44 |
| Europe (European Hit Radio) | 22 |
| France (SNEP) | 44 |
| Iceland (Íslenski Listinn Topp 40) | 34 |
| Italy (Musica e dischi) | 18 |
| New Zealand (Recorded Music NZ) | 5 |
| Sweden (Sverigetopplistan) | 25 |
| Switzerland (Schweizer Hitparade) | 37 |
| UK Singles (Official Charts) | 30 |
| UK Airplay (Music Week) | 34 |
| US Bubbling Under Hot 100 (Billboard) | 5 |
| US Alternative Airplay (Billboard) | 23 |
| US Mainstream Rock (Billboard) | 7 |

== Release history ==
Release dates and formats for "Shock to the System"
| Region | Date | Format(s) | Label(s) | Ref. |
|---|---|---|---|---|
| United States | 8 June 1993 | CD | Chrysalis | |
| United Kingdom | 14 June 1993 | 7-inch vinyl; 12-inch vinyl; CD | Chrysalis | |
| Japan | 28 July 1993 | Mini-CD | Chrysalis | |
