= Cradle of Love (Billy Idol song) =

1990 single by Billy Idol

Single by Billy Idol

from the album Charmed Life
- B-side: "311 Man"
- Released: 16 April 1990
- Genre: New wave; hard rock
- Length: 4:39
- Label: Chrysalis
- Songwriters: David Werner; Billy Idol
- Producer: Keith Forsey

Billy Idol singles chronology
"Mony Mony" (live) (1987)	"Cradle of Love" (1990)	"L.A. Woman" (1990)

Music video
- "Cradle of Love" on YouTube

"Cradle of Love" is a song by the English rock singer Billy Idol, released in 1990 as the first single from his fourth studio album, Charmed Life. The song was written by David Werner and Idol, and was produced by Keith Forsey. It became Idol's last top-10 hit in the United States, where it reached No. 2 on the Billboard Hot 100. It was also Idol's first and only No. 1 hit on the Billboard Album Rock Tracks chart. On the UK Single Chart, it stalled at No. 34.

== Music and lyrics ==
"Cradle of Love" is a new wave and hard rock song with a doo-wop melody, influenced by 1950s rock 'n' roll and "Ramones-esque punk". It is composed in common time and in the key of B♭ major. The song title is supposedly based on the saying "robbing the cradle".

"Cradle of Love" was originally written solely by David Werner. In 1989, he demoed the song and a number of other tracks with Mark Doyle on guitar, Tom Bellin on bass and Rob Deaner on keyboards. Werner then shopped the demos to various record labels in the attempt to gain their interest. He was left to choose between signing his own album recording deal with CBS Records or giving "Cradle of Love" to Billy Idol to record through Elektra Records for an upcoming film, The Adventures of Ford Fairlane. He decided on the latter option after Idol's label Chrysalis also expressed interest in including the track on the singer's next album, Charmed Life. Idol received a co-writing credit after he made some changes and additions to the lyrics during its recording.

== Critical reception ==
Upon its release as a single, Gary Crossing of Record Mirror commented that Idol "sneers, growls and rebel yells his way through another laughable, leatherclad anthem". Phil Wilding of Kerrang! concluded, "Getting hit off his bike has obviously caused Billy to slip into regression and convince himself that he's Marc Bolan. He's dead, Billy. Wake up and smell the earth." In the US, Billboard remarked that "Idol fans will relish in the singer's familiar, quick-paced, guitar-driven pop".

== Music video ==
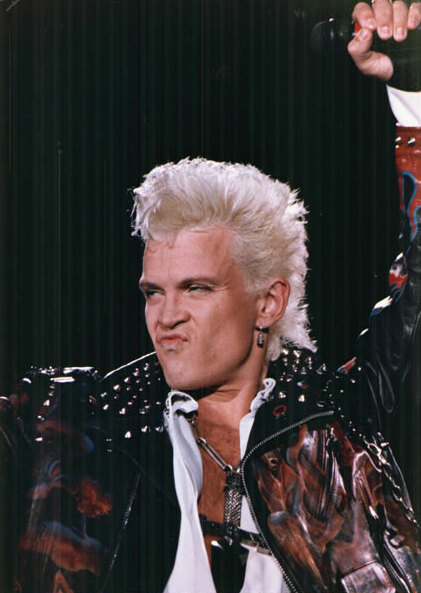
A photo of Billy Idol taken during the Cradle of Love Tour. The jacket is the same jacket that he wears in the video.

Two versions of the music video were created, both directed by David Fincher. The first one features footage of Idol singing in large painting frames throughout an apartment. The director made the decision to film Idol from the waist up as he was unable to walk due to injuries from a February 1990 motorcycle crash. The video also features Betsy Lynn George as Devon, a teenager who tries to seduce a modest and mild-mannered businessman (played by Joshua Townshend-Zellner). This version makes use of clips from the film The Adventures of Ford Fairlane.

The second version of the video does not feature the movie's footage, as Andrew Dice Clay (who played Fairlane) had been banned from MTV; instead a man playing the guitar is depicted as heard in the track. This was the one most widely played and was placed in heavy rotation on MTV.

At the 1990 MTV Video Music Awards, the video was nominated for Best Male Video and Best Special Effects and won the award for Best Video from a Film. The video was voted number 33 on VH1's 50 Sexiest Video Moments.

Idol and George recreated the opening of the video for the 1991 Grammys.

== Awards and nominations ==
Awards and nominations for "Cradle of Love"
Year	Award	Category	Result
1990	MTV Video Music Awards	Best Video From a Film	Won
1990	MTV Video Music Awards	Best Male Video	Nominated
1990	MTV Video Music Awards	Best Special Effects	Nominated
1991	ASCAP Pop Music Awards	Most Performed Song	Won
1991	Brit Awards	Best British Video	Nominated
1991	Grammy Awards	Best Male Rock Vocal Performance	Nominated

== Track listings ==
7-inch: Chrysalis – IDOL 14 (UK)

1. "Cradle of Love" (4:39)
2. "311 Man" (3:51)

12-inch: Chrysalis – IDOLX 14 (UK)

1. "Cradle of Dub" (extended remix) (6:27)
2. "Cradle of Love" (LP version) (4:39)
3. "Rob the Cradle of Dub" (extended mix) (5:07)
4. "311 Man" (3:51)
- Also released as 12-inch picture disc (IDOLXP 14)

CD: Chrysalis – IDOLCD 14 (UK)

1. "Cradle of Love" (edit) (4:09)
2. "Cradle of Dub" (extended remix) (6:27)
3. "Rob the Cradle of Dub" (extended mix) (5:07)
4. "311 Man" (3:51)

Idol's live performance of the song at the 1991 Grammy Awards was released on the 1994 album Grammy's Greatest Moments Volume I.

== Charts ==
=== Weekly charts ===
Weekly chart performance for "Cradle of Love"
Chart (1990)	Peak position
Australia (ARIA)	10
Canada Top Singles (RPM)	10
Europe (Eurochart Hot 100)	73
Finland (Suomen virallinen lista)	8
Ireland (IRMA)	22
Italy (Musica e dischi)	7
Italy Airplay (Music & Media)	7
New Zealand (Recorded Music NZ)	16
Switzerland (Schweizer Hitparade)	11
UK Singles (Official Charts)	34
US Billboard Hot 100	2
US Alternative Airplay (Billboard)	7
US Crossover Radio Airplay Top 40/Rock (Billboard)	1
US Mainstream Rock (Billboard)	1
US Cash Box Top 100	2
West Germany (GfK)	38

=== Year-end charts ===
Year-end chart performance for "Cradle of Love"
Chart (1990)	Position
Australia (ARIA)	48
Canada Top Singles (RPM)	60
US Billboard Hot 100	9
US Album Rock Tracks (Billboard)	4
US Cash Box Top 100	17

== Certifications ==
Certifications for "Cradle of Love"
Region	Certification	Certified units/sales
Australia (ARIA)	Gold	35,000^{^}
United States (RIAA)	Gold	500,000^{^}
^{^} Shipments figures based on certification alone.

== Release history ==
Release dates and formats for "Cradle of Love"
Region	Date	Format(s)	Label(s)	Ref.
United Kingdom	16 April 1990	7-inch vinyl; 12-inch vinyl; CD	Chrysalis	
Australia	30 April 1990	7-inch vinyl; 12-inch vinyl; cassette	Chrysalis	
Japan	23 May 1990	Mini CD (with "311 Man")	Chrysalis	

== Cover versions ==
Alvin and the Chipmunks covered this song as the opening track to their 1991 album The Chipmunks Rock the House. In 1992, "Weird Al" Yankovic included the chorus as the first song in his polka medley "Polka Your Eyes Out" from his album Off the Deep End.
