= L.A. Woman (song) =

1971 single by The Doors

- Morrison's handwritten original lyrics

Song by the Doors

from the album L.A. Woman
- Released: April 19, 1971
- Recorded: December 1970 – January 1971
- Studio: The Doors' Workshop, Los Angeles
- Genre: Blues rock
- Length: 7:49
- Label: Elektra
- Songwriter: The Doors
- Producers: The Doors; Bruce Botnick

"L.A. Woman" is a song by the American rock band the Doors. The song is the title track of their 1971 album L.A. Woman, the final album to feature Jim Morrison before his death on July 3, 1971. In 2014, LA Weekly named it the all-time best song written about the city of Los Angeles.

In 1985, fourteen years after Morrison's death, Ray Manzarek directed and Rick Schmidlin produced a music video for the song. It was aired on MTV and included in the Doors film Dance on Fire.

Band guitarist Robby Krieger has repeatedly cited "L.A. Woman" as the "quintessential Doors song". In 2013, it was labeled the 40th best classic-rock song by the New York radio station Q104.3.

== Lyrics ==
"L.A. Woman" has been viewed as Morrison's "final goodbye" to Los Angeles, before his move to Paris, France. The song's lyrics draw inspiration from John Rechy's transgressive novel City of Night, published in 1963, while its title is expressed as a metaphor, personifying L.A. (Los Angeles) as a woman. In author Melissa Ursula Dawn Goldsmith's description, it is also used to describe the city's topography and atmosphere.

In the bridge, Morrison repeats the phrase "Mr. Mojo Risin'," which is an anagram of his name "Jim Morrison". Doors drummer John Densmore later explained the story of the line:

After we recorded the song, he wrote "Mr. Mojo Rising" [sic] on a board and said, "Look at this." He moves the letters around and it was an anagram for his name. I knew that mojo was a sexual term from the blues, and that gave me the idea to go slow and dark with the tempo. It also gave me the idea to slowly speed it up like an orgasm.

A yellow sheet of lined A4 paper with the lyrics of the track, handwritten by Morrison, was auctioned in Berkshire, UK for £13,000 on August 4, 2009.

== Personnel ==
The Doors

- Jim Morrison – vocals
- Ray Manzarek – Wurlitzer piano, Fender Rhodes piano
- Robby Krieger – lead guitar
- John Densmore – drums

Additional musicians

- Jerry Scheff – bass guitar
- Marc Benno – rhythm guitar

== Certifications ==
Certifications for "L.A. Woman"
Region	Certification	Certified units/sales
United Kingdom (BPI)	Silver	200,000^{‡}
United States (RIAA)	Platinum	1,000,000^{‡}
^{‡} Sales+streaming figures based on certification alone.

== Billy Idol version ==
"L.A. Woman"

Single by Billy Idol

from the album Charmed Life
- B-side: "License to Thrill"
- Released: July 23, 1990
- Length: 5:29 (album version); 3:58 (single edit)
- Label: Chrysalis
- Songwriter: The Doors
- Producer: Keith Forsey

Billy Idol singles chronology
"Cradle of Love" (1990)	"L.A. Woman" (1990)	"Prodigal Blues" (1990)

Music video
- "L.A. Woman" on YouTube

English singer Billy Idol recorded a version of "L.A. Woman" for his fourth studio album Charmed Life (1990). As the album's second single, Idol's version reached number 52 on the Billboard Hot 100 in October 1990. The song's music video was directed by David Fincher and received heavy rotation on MTV.

The Doors and Jim Morrison were an influence on Idol during his early years in the music industry. In a 1990 interview with the Associated Press, Idol commented on his interpretation of the song in comparison to the Doors' original, "Jim Morrison was singing about America or L.A. as a microcosm of an America he was very jaded with, really, to the extent that he left it go to Europe, whereas I'm the other way around. I'm still having a bit of a love affair with America and so it's exciting to be the 'lost angel'."

=== Charts ===
Weekly chart performance for Billy Idol's cover
Chart (1990)	Peak position
Australia (ARIA)	34
Canada Top Singles (RPM)	40
Ireland (IRMA)	28
Italy (Musica e dischi)	17
New Zealand (Recorded Music NZ)	25
UK Singles (Official Charts)	70
US Billboard Hot 100	52
US Mainstream Rock Airplay (Billboard)	18
US Radio Songs (Billboard)	99
US Cash Box Top 100 Singles	46

=== Release history ===
Release dates and formats for Billy Idol's cover
Region	Date	Format(s)	Label(s)	Ref(s).
Australia	July 23, 1990	7-inch vinyl; cassette	Chrysalis	
United Kingdom	July 23, 1990	7-inch vinyl; 12-inch vinyl; CD; cassette	Chrysalis	
Australia	August 20, 1990	12-inch vinyl	Chrysalis	
Japan	October 24, 1990	Mini-CD	Chrysalis	
