= David Werner (musician) =

American singer

- Origin: Pittsburgh, Pennsylvania, United States
- Genres: Glam rock, Pop rock
- Occupation: Singer, songwriter
- Label: Epic

David Werner is an American rock singer, songwriter, and guitarist from Pittsburgh, Pennsylvania.

== Biography ==
Werner was born in Pittsburgh and released two albums on RCA Victor in the mid-1970s before signing with Epic Records later in the decade. His full-length, self-titled album, released in 1979, reached #65 on the Billboard 200 on the strength of the single "What's Right", which reached #104 on the Billboard pop chart in October of that year.

His best-known composition is the song "Cradle of Love", which was recorded by Billy Idol on his 1990 album Charmed Life and released on the soundtrack to the 1990 film The Adventures of Ford Fairlane.

== Discography ==
- Whizz Kid (RCA Victor, 1974)
- Imagination Quota (RCA Victor, 1975)
- David Werner (Epic Records, 1979)
- Live (Epic Records, 1979)
