= Signal to Noise (Sinclair novel) =

1997 novel by Carla Sinclair

- Author: Carla Sinclair
- Language: English
- Publication date: 1997

Signal to Noise (ISBN 978-0062515346) is a 1997 cyberpunk novel by Carla Sinclair published by Harper. This was the author's first novel; she had previously written non-fiction works. It is set in San Francisco. Tiffany Lee Brown, writing in Wired magazine, stated that the "cybercultural parody" reflected "distinctive perspective on the foibles of the wired life" and "caricatures" people in the San Francisco technology environment.

According to the author she took seven months to create the initial draft before selling it to the publisher, which asked for a substantial rewrite within a two-month period; the publishers stated a dislike of the, in Sinclair's words, "too clichéd" criminal characters. Sinclair stated that the rewrite affected about 66% of the book. She did the rewrite during a pregnancy. Sinclair stated that she included elements she noticed in real life and that she enjoyed writing scenes portraying violence, citing an increase in adrenaline, rather than having them make her anxious.

== Reception ==
In Wired magazine, Brown described it as "fast-paced" and stated that people familiar with the technology industry would enjoy it the most although she believed general audiences would also enjoy the book. She stated "If you're looking for the next Ulysses, better go elsewhere."

In The Austin Chronicle newspaper, Jon Lebkowsky noted that though Signal to Noise made reference to various 1990s cybercultural people and pop culture touchstones, "the book borrows less from Wired and more from Raymond Chandler, Elmore Leonard, and Carl Hiaasen."

Kirkus Reviews posted a review stating that "the clothes, lunch hangouts, and familiar ambitions of this self-consciously cutting- edge scene" were a positive element but that it "goes downhill fast when it devolves into a breathless kidnapping/romance" as that resulted in "boredom".
