= R. U. Sirius =

American writer and talk show host

R. U. Sirius (born Ken Goffman in 1952) is an American writer, editor, talk show host, musician and cyberculture celebrity. He is best known as co-founder of Mondo 2000 magazine and its original editor-in-chief from 1989 to 1993.

Sirius has written for Wired and Wired News, San Francisco Examiner, Artforum, Rolling Stone, Time, Esquire and many other publications.

== Activities ==
=== 1980s ===
From 1984 onward, Sirius edited a counterculture magazine that started as High Frontiers with a focus on recreational drug use. In 1988 it was renamed Reality Hackers to reflect increased content about digital culture issues. The following year it became Mondo 2000.

=== 1990s ===
Sirius left Mondo 2000 in 1993, and the magazine folded in 1998 after 17 issues.

In 1993, Sirius was quoted in The Nation magazine about the internet and its future. This July 1993 piece, The Whole World is Talking, was The Nation's first article about the internet.

Sirius recruited Timothy Leary to be a contributing editor for Mondo 2000 and taught an online course in Leary's philosophy for the Maybe Logic Academy. He co-authored Leary's last book, Design for Dying (1998), and wrote the introduction for a 1998 edition of Leary's 1968 book The Politics of Ecstasy.

Sirius appeared in the films Synthetic Pleasures (1995) and Conceiving Ada (1997). His mid-1990s techno-rock band Mondo Vanilli recorded an unreleased CD titled IOU Babe for Trent Reznor's Nothing Records. The music is available on Bandcamp IOU Babe, by Mondo Vanilli.

Sirius spoke at many events, such as the Starwood Festival. He delivered the second Keynote address for the Virtual Reality conference, Oslo VR, in 1994.

=== 2000s ===
Sirius was chairman and candidate in the 2000 U.S. presidential election for the Revolution Party. The party's 20-point platform was a hybrid of libertarianism and liberalism.

During the 2000s Sirius published four books. In 2005 he began hosting two weekly podcasts, the RU Sirius Show and NeoFiles. Both went on unannounced hiatus in August 2007 because their financial backer withdrew his support. In September 2006 Sirius helped launch the webzine 10 Zen Monkeys with fellow GettingIt.com alumni Jeff Diehl and Lou Cabron.

From October 2008 to May 2010, Sirius was head editor of the transhumanist magazine H+ Magazine. He then turned his attention to a project documenting the history of Mondo 2000.

=== 2010s ===
From June 2011 to November 2012, R. U. Sirius ran Acceler8or, a counterculture, Singularitarian/Transhumanist website. Mondo 2000 was briefly relaunched online in 2017 and went offline in 2025.

== Media editorships ==
- High Frontiers. 1984-1988.
- Reality Hackers. 1988-1989.
- Mondo 2000. 1989–1993.
- Axcess. 1998.
- GettingIt.com. 1999–2000.
- RU Sirius Show. 2005–2007.
- NeoFiles. 2005–2007.
- H+ Magazine. 2008–2010.
- Acceler8or. 2011–2012.

== Bibliography ==
=== Books ===
- Transcendence: The Disinformation Encyclopedia of Transhumanism and the Singularity. (2015) (with Jay Cornell). Disinformation Books. ISBN 978-1938875090.
- Everybody Must Get Stoned. Rock Stars On Drugs. (2009). Citadel. ISBN 978-0-8065-3073-4.
- True Mutations. (2007) Pollinator Press. ISBN 978-0-9774410-1-3.
- Counterculture Through the Ages: From Abraham to Acid House. (2004) Villard Books. ISBN 0-375-50758-2.
- The Revolution: Quotations From Revolution Party Chairman R. U. Sirius. (2000) Feral House. ISBN 0-922915-62-8.
- 21st Century Revolutionary: R. U. Sirius 1984–1998. (1999) Fringecore ISBN 90-76207-51-8.
- Design for Dying. (1998) (with Timothy Leary) HarperCollins. ISBN 0-06-092866-2.
- How to Mutate & Take Over the World: an Exploded Post-Novel. (1997) (with St. Jude) Random House. ISBN 0-517-19832-0.
- Cyberpunk Handbook: The Real Cyberpunk Fakebook. (1995) (with St. Jude and Bart Nagel) Random House. ISBN 0-679-76230-2.
- Mondo 2000: A User's Guide to the New Edge. (1992) (editor with Rudy Rucker & Queen Mu) Harperperennial Library. ISBN 0-06-096928-8.

=== Articles ===
- Sirius, R.U. (October 19, 2000). "Steal This Millennium". Salon.com. Archived from the original on December 20, 2011.
- The RU Sirius Show and NeoFiles. 80-odd podcast interviews, and counting. (With co-hosts including Sherry Miller, Diana Brown, Steve Robles and producer Jeff Diehl.)
- "Todd Brendan Fahey and His Acid-Laden Writing Style"
