= Carla Sinclair =

American writer and journalist

Carla Sinclair (born August 15, 1964) is an American writer and journalist. She is co-founder of the collaborative weblog Boing Boing. Along with her husband, Mark Frauenfelder, she founded the bOING bOING print zine in 1988, where she acted as editor until the print version folded in 1997. She wrote the book Net Chick, was author of the cyberculture thriller Signal to Noise, as well as four other published books. She was editor-in-chief at Craft magazine for O'Reilly Media.
