= Boing Boing =

Blog site

- Screenshot Screenshot on April 7, 2025
- Website type: Blog
- Owner: Happy Mutants
- Founders: Carla Sinclair, Mark Frauenfelder
- Editors: Mark Frauenfelder, David Pescovitz, Rob Beschizza, Carla Sinclair
- Key people: Jason Weisberger, Cory Doctorow (until January 2020), Xeni Jardin (until February 2021)
- Website: boingboing.net
- Commercial: Yes
- Launched: 1988 (zine); 1995 (website); 2000 (blog)

Boing Boing is a website, first established as a zine in 1988, later becoming a group blog. Common topics and themes include technology, futurism, science fiction, gadgets, intellectual property, Disney, and left-wing politics. It twice won the Bloggies for Weblog of the Year, in 2004 and 2005. The editors are Mark Frauenfelder, David Pescovitz, Carla Sinclair, and Rob Beschizza, and the publisher is Jason Weisberger.

One report named Boing Boing as the most popular blog in the world until 2006, when Chinese-language blogs became popular; it remained among the most widely linked and cited blogs into the 2010s.

== History ==
Boing Boing (originally bOING bOING) started as a zine in 1988 by married duo Mark Frauenfelder and Carla Sinclair. Issues were subtitled "The World's Greatest Neurozine". Associate editors included Gareth Branwyn, Jon Lebkowsky, Paco Nathan, and David Pescovitz. Along with Mondo 2000, Boing Boing was an influence in the development of the cyberpunk subculture. It reached a maximum circulation of 17,500 copies. The last issue of the zine was #15.

Boing Boing was established as a website in 1995; it became a web-only publication one year later. While researching for an article about blogs in 1999, Frauenfelder became acquainted with the Blogger software. He relaunched Boing Boing as a weblog on 21 January 2000, describing it as a "directory of wonderful things". Over time, Frauenfelder was joined by four co-editors: Cory Doctorow, Pescovitz, Xeni Jardin and Beschizza, all of whom previously contributed to Wired magazine. Maggie Koerth-Baker, after a run as a guest blogger in 2009, joined the site as its Science Editor, leaving to join a Nieman Foundation fellowship in 2014.

In September 2003, Boing Boing removed their Quicktopics user-comment feature without warning or explanation. Bloggers commenting on the change at the time speculated that it stemmed from "identity impersonators and idiot flamers" pretending to be co-editors. Jardin was a guest on the NewsHour with Jim Lehrer to discuss The Washington Post's decision to remove its Comments section on its website, and she spoke from her experience at Boing Boing. In August 2007, Boing Boing staff launched a redesigned site, which included a restored comment facility, moderated by Teresa Nielsen Hayden. In 2013, Boing Boing switched from the proprietary Disqus comment system to Discourse, an open-source internet forum developed by Jeff Atwood, Robin Ward and Sam Saffron. In October 2024, Boing Boing launched a premium, ad-free version of the blog on Substack. From then onward, access to comments would be limited to paying Substack users.

In 2004, the project incorporated as Happy Mutants LLC, and John Battelle became the blog's business manager. Boing Boing, by the mid-2000s, "had become one of the most-read and linked-to blogs in the world" according to Fast Company.

The site added advertising over the course of late 2004, placed above and to the left and right of material, and, in 2005, in the site's RSS feed as well. Editor Cory Doctorow noted that "John [Battelle] said it's going to be harder to make a little money to pay your bandwidth bills than it will be to make a lot of money and have a real source of income from this." The advertising income during the first quarter was already $27,000, and as of 2010, Boing Boing still "makes a nice living for its founders and a handful of contract employees", but it is no longer a member of Battelle's blog network Federated Media Publishing, Inc.

Boing Boing featured a "guest blogger" sidebar, then stopped the series in summer of 2004. In 2008, the "guest blogger" series was resumed, with guests posting in the main blog for two-week periods.

In September 2006, Boing Boing introduced a weekly podcast, "Boing Boing Boing", intended to cover the week's posts and upcoming projects. The show's cast consists of the Boing Boing editors, accompanied by a weekly guest. In the same month, Boing Boing introduced a second podcast called "Get Illuminated", which features interviews with writers, artists, and other creatives.

The site's own original content is licensed under a Creative Commons Attribution Non-Commercial license, as of November 2019.

In September 2009, Boing Boing refused to comply with a demand from Polo Ralph Lauren's lawyers to remove a post concerning a heavily manipulated image of model Filippa Hamilton, originally published by the Photoshop Disasters blog. The latter was forced to comply with the company's demand by its hosting provider. Ralph Lauren issued DMCA takedown notices to Boing Boing's ISP and Blogspot, which hosts Photoshop Disasters, claiming their use of the image infringed copyright. Blogspot complied, but Boing Boing's ISP consulted with Boing Boing and agreed that the image was fair use. As a result, Boing Boing issued a mocking rebuttal, using the same image again and posting the takedown notice.

The rebuttal was widely reported, including on frequently viewed websites such as The Huffington Post and ABC News.

On 3 May 2011, the first podcast of "Gweek" was released. Gweek is a podcast in which the editors and friends of Boing Boing talk about comic books, science fiction and fantasy, video games, TV shows, music, movies, tools, gadgets, apps, and other "neat" stuff. In the first episode of Gweek, Rob Beschizza and Mark Frauenfelder discussed subjects such as the video game Portal 2, graphic novels, upcoming science fiction books, and recommendations of some of their favorite adventure games for mobile platforms. Boing Boing has since added several other podcasts.

In November 2017, the site was sued by Playboy, which alleged that a hyperlink to copyright-infringing content at Imgur and YouTube was itself illegal. A Federal Court dismissed Playboy's claims on 14 February 2018 and Playboy released a statement suggesting that it was standing down on 28 February.

Cory Doctorow left Boing Boing in January 2020, and soon started a solo blogging project titled Pluralistic. The circumstances surrounding Doctorow's exit from the website were unclear at the time, although Doctorow acknowledged that he remained a co-owner of Boing Boing. MetaFilter described the end of the 19-year association between Doctorow and Boing Boing as "the equivalent of the Beatles breaking up" for the blog world. Doctorow's exit was not acknowledged by Boing Boing, with his name being quietly removed from the list of editors on 29 January 2020.

== Unicorn chaser ==
A "unicorn chaser" is a practice created by Boing Boing editors as an antidote to blog postings linking to sites containing disgusting or shocking images. The shocking post would be immediately followed by another post containing a picture of a unicorn. Xeni Jardin posted the first one (titled "And now, we pause for a Unicorn Moment.") in August 2003 as a reply to a picture of a rash posted by editor Mark Frauenfelder in an attempt to get readers to diagnose it for him. It has also been used as an antidote for posts containing photos of a brain tumor, a man who pumped up the skin of his face with saline solution, many different ways to clean one's earwax, and a lengthy discussion of the Internet video "2 Girls 1 Cup".

On 18 May 2007, Boing Boing announced that Virgin America, as part of its "Name Our Planes!" campaign, would be naming one of its new aircraft "Unicorn Chaser", after having asked Boing Boing to suggest a name. An Airbus A320 with registration code N626VA eventually joined the fleet with that name.

== Boing Boing Gadgets and Offworld ==
In August 2007, Boing Boing introduced a gadgets-focused companion site headed by former Gizmodo editor Joel Johnson. Johnson left in July 2009, to be replaced by Rob Beschizza, formerly of Wired News. Other writers include Steven Leckart and Lisa Katayama. Offworld, a blog covering video games edited by Brandon Boyer, was added in November 2008. These sites were incorporated into Boing Boing itself around 2010. Plans to revive the Offworld site were announced in 2015, with Leigh Alexander as Editor-in-Chief and Laura Hudson as Editor. Leigh Alexander and Laura Hudson left Offworld in early 2016 after publishing a collection of selected articles, successfully crowdfunded on Kickstarter in March 2016.

== Boing Boing TV ==
In October 2007, Boing Boing started a new component, Boing Boing TV, that consists of video segments including SPAMasterpiece Theater (2008) with John Hodgman, produced by its co-editors in conjunction with DECA, the Digital Entertainment Corporation of America. Art tech group monochrom was a frequent contributor. They created their sock puppet series Kiki and Bubu for Boing Boing TV.
The episodes appear online, as well as on Virgin America flights.

== Censorship ==
Boing Boing has been described as an "outspoken critic of censorship elsewhere", and operates a high speed, high quality Tor exit node. For example, the act of "disemvoweling" was popularized by the site—literally stripping out the vowels of any comment a moderator had taken exception to.

=== Violet Blue controversy ===
Sex blogger Violet Blue has been mentioned, interviewed and once contributed at Boing Boing. On 23 June 2008, Blue posted on her blog, Tiny Nibbles, that all posts related to her had been deleted from Boing Boing, without explanation. The Los Angeles Times featured an interview that cast the silence on the part of Boing Boing on the matter as "inexplicable", causing a controversy as Boing Boing "has often presented itself as a stalwart of cultural openness". A heated debate ensued after a brief statement on the Boing Boing site regarding this action stated: "Violet behaved in a way that made us reconsider whether we wanted to lend her any credibility or associate with her. It's our blog and so we made an editorial decision, like we do every single day". In commentary attached to that blog entry, "many commenters surmised that they had something to do with Blue's suing to stop a porn star from also using the name Violet Blue", and many commenters found the removal troubling, but Xeni Jardin said that she hoped she would not have to make the reasons public.
