= Mark Frauenfelder =

American journalist

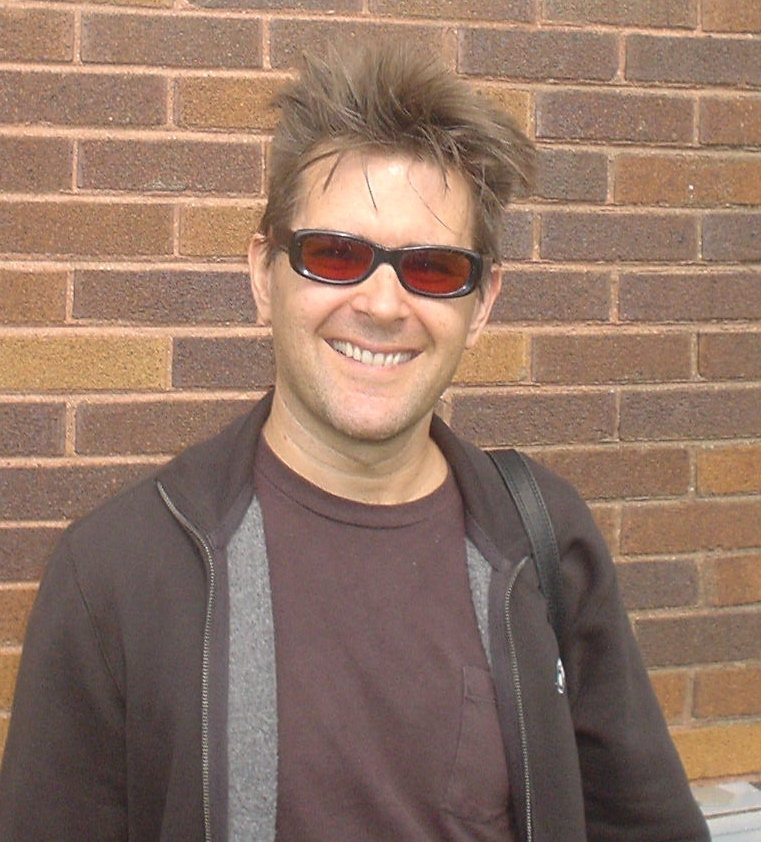
- Mark Frauenfelder
- Born: November 22, 1960 (age 65)
- Occupation: Journalist
- Spouse: Carla Sinclair

Mark Frauenfelder (born November 22, 1960) is an American blogger, illustrator, and journalist. He was editor-in-chief of the magazine MAKE and is co-owner of the collaborative weblog Boing Boing. Along with his wife, Carla Sinclair, he founded the Boing Boing print zine in 1988, and he acted as co-editor until the print version folded in 1997. There his work was discovered by Billy Idol, who consulted Frauenfelder for his Cyberpunk album. While designing Boing Boing and co-editing it with Sinclair, Frauenfelder became an editor at Wired from 1993 to 1998 and the "Living Online" columnist for Playboy magazine from 1998 to 2002. He is the co-editor of The Happy Mutant Handbook (1995, Riverhead Books), and was the author and illustrator of Mad Professor (2002, Chronicle Books). He is the author and illustrator of World's Worst (2005, Chronicle Books) and The Computer: An Illustrated History (2005, Carlton Books). He is the author of Rule the Web: How to Do Anything and Everything on the Internet—Better, Faster, Easier (2007, St. Martin's Griffin), and Made by Hand (2010, Portfolio). He was interviewed on the Colbert Report in March 2007 and in June 2010.

On June 21, 2003, Frauenfelder and Sinclair moved from Los Angeles to Rarotonga, an island in the South Pacific, where they lived for five months with their two young daughters. Frauenfelder wrote about the experience as a website called The Island Chronicles.

Mark currently works at Institute for the Future as a Research Director.
