= 1997 Webby Awards =

US internet awards ceremony

The 1997 Webby Awards were the first of the annual Webby Awards, and also the first-ever nationally televised awards ceremony devoted to the Internet. 700 people attended the event on March 6, 1997, at Bimbo's Night Club in San Francisco, California.

== Nominees and winners ==
(from

Category	Webby Award winner	Other nominees
Art and Design	Entropy8 (Archived 15 April 1997 via Wayback)	AdaWeb (Archived 12 April 1997 via Wayback)
Art and Design	Entropy8 (Archived 15 April 1997 via Wayback)	@tlas (http://atlas.organic.com)
Art and Design	Entropy8 (Archived 15 April 1997 via Wayback)	Eadweard Muybridge: New Media Pioneer (Archived 15 January 2009 via Wayback)
Art and Design	Entropy8 (Archived 15 April 1997 via Wayback)	Migraine Boy (Archived 3 February 1997 via Wayback)
Books and magazines	Salon (Archived 12 December 1998 via Wayback)	Feed Magazine (Archived 25 February 1997 via Wayback)
Books and magazines	Salon (Archived 12 December 1998 via Wayback)	Suck (Archived 14 January 1997 via Wayback)
Books and magazines	Salon (Archived 12 December 1998 via Wayback)	24 Hours in Cyberspace (Archived 11 February 1997 via Wayback)
Books and magazines	Salon (Archived 12 December 1998 via Wayback)	Urban Desires (Archived 21 February 1997 via Wayback)
Games	You Don't Know Jack (http://www.bezerk.com)	Macromedia Shockwave Gallery (Archived 26 October 1996 via Wayback)
Games	You Don't Know Jack (http://www.bezerk.com)	Happy Puppy (Archived 12 April 1997 via Wayback)
Games	You Don't Know Jack (http://www.bezerk.com)	GameSpot (Archived 22 March 1997 via Wayback)
Games	You Don't Know Jack (http://www.bezerk.com)	Games Domain (Archived 13 April 1997 via Wayback)
Home	Family Planet (Archived 17 October 1996 via Wayback)	HomeArts (Archived 3 May 1997 via Wayback)
Home	Family Planet (Archived 17 October 1996 via Wayback)	Cocktail (Archived 7 March 1997 via Wayback)
Home	Family Planet (Archived 17 October 1996 via Wayback)	Britannica Online (Archived 3 July 1998 via Wayback)
Home	Family Planet (Archived 17 October 1996 via Wayback)	Toiletology 101 (Archived 20 February 1997 via Wayback)
Living / Health	Reuters Health Information (Archived 4 January 1997 via Wayback)	Women's Edge (Archived 1 December 1998 via Wayback)
Living / Health	Reuters Health Information (Archived 4 January 1997 via Wayback)	Planet Out (Archived 22 February 1997 via Wayback)
Living / Health	Reuters Health Information (Archived 4 January 1997 via Wayback)	DeathNet (Archived 17 January 1999 via Wayback)
Living / Health	Reuters Health Information (Archived 4 January 1997 via Wayback)	Acupuncture.com (Archived 9 February 1997 via Wayback)
Money	Edmunds Automobile Guide (Archived 28 March 1997 via Wayback)	The Motley Fool (Archived 26 January 1997 via Wayback)
Money	Edmunds Automobile Guide (Archived 28 March 1997 via Wayback)	Fortune (Archived 16 February 1998 via Wayback)
Money	Edmunds Automobile Guide (Archived 28 March 1997 via Wayback)	CNNfn (Archived 30 March 1997 via Wayback)
Money	Edmunds Automobile Guide (Archived 28 March 1997 via Wayback)	Adbuster's Culture Jammer's Headquarters (Archived 17 February 1997 via Wayback)
Movie and Film	Internet Movie Database (Archived 22 January 1997 via Wayback)	Cinemedia Site (Archived 19 June 1997 via Wayback)
Movie and Film	Internet Movie Database (Archived 22 January 1997 via Wayback)	Mr. Showbiz (Archived 26 October 1996 via Wayback)
Movie and Film	Internet Movie Database (Archived 22 January 1997 via Wayback)	Film.com (Archived 18 October 1996 via Wayback)
Movie and Film	Internet Movie Database (Archived 22 January 1997 via Wayback)	E!Online (Archived 9 April 1997 via Wayback)
Music	SonicNet (Archived 6 June 1997 via Wayback)	Wilma (http://www.wilma.com)
Music	SonicNet (Archived 6 June 1997 via Wayback)	Addicted to Noise (Archived 15 June 1997 via Wayback)
Music	SonicNet (Archived 6 June 1997 via Wayback)	Microsoft Music Central (Archived 15 February 1997 via Wayback)
Music	SonicNet (Archived 6 June 1997 via Wayback)	Tunes.com (http://www.tunes.com)
Politics + Law	The Netizen (Archived 2 December 1998 via Wayback)	Disinformation (Archived 7 April 1997 via Wayback)
Politics + Law	The Netizen (Archived 2 December 1998 via Wayback)	California Voter Foundation (Archived 20 April 2012 via Wayback)
Politics + Law	The Netizen (Archived 2 December 1998 via Wayback)	Channel A (Archived 7 February 1997 via Wayback)
Politics + Law	The Netizen (Archived 2 December 1998 via Wayback)	The Stalker's Home Page (Archived 17 January 1999 via Wayback)
Science	The Exploratorium (Archived 15 January 1997 via Wayback)	ArchNet (Archived 16 July 1998 via Wayback)
Science	The Exploratorium (Archived 15 January 1997 via Wayback)	The Discovery Channel Online (Archived 30 March 1997 via Wayback)
Science	The Exploratorium (Archived 15 January 1997 via Wayback)	Scientific American (Archived 15 February 1997 via Wayback)
Science	The Exploratorium (Archived 15 January 1997 via Wayback)	Smithsonian Magazine (Archived 14 April 1997 via Wayback)
Sports	ESPNet SportsZone (Archived 2 December 1998 via Wayback)	Charged (Archived 12 April 1997 via Wayback)
Sports	ESPNet SportsZone (Archived 2 December 1998 via Wayback)	The Coach's Edge (Archived 31 January 1997 via Wayback)
Sports	ESPNet SportsZone (Archived 2 December 1998 via Wayback)	Instant Ballpark (Archived 1 January 1997 via Wayback)
Sports	ESPNet SportsZone (Archived 2 December 1998 via Wayback)	SkiNet (Archived 4 February 1997 via Wayback)
Television	The Gist (Archived 12 February 1997 via Wayback)	Edrive (Archived 15 June 1997 via Wayback)
Television	The Gist (Archived 12 February 1997 via Wayback)	PBS Online (Archived 5 June 1997 via Wayback)
Television	The Gist (Archived 12 February 1997 via Wayback)	UltimateTV (Online Service) (Archived 25 January 1998 via Wayback)
Television	The Gist (Archived 12 February 1997 via Wayback)	The Biz (Archived 2 December 2000 via Wayback)
Travel	TravelMag (Archived 5 December 1998 via Wayback)	The Rough Guide USA (Archived 8 March 2001 via Wayback)
Travel	TravelMag (Archived 5 December 1998 via Wayback)	Route 66 (Archived 5 February 1997 via Wayback)
Travel	TravelMag (Archived 5 December 1998 via Wayback)	Travelocity (Archived 27 January 1997 via Wayback)
Travel	TravelMag (Archived 5 December 1998 via Wayback)	travlang (Archived 27 February 1997 via Wayback)
Weird	Gallery of the Absurd (Archived 5 December 1998 via Wayback)	Ad Nauseam (Archived 1 December 1998 via Wayback)
Weird	Gallery of the Absurd (Archived 5 December 1998 via Wayback)	Fetish (http://www2.gol.com/users/zapkdarc/fetish.html)
Weird	Gallery of the Absurd (Archived 5 December 1998 via Wayback)	Entropy Gradient Reversal (Archived 15 June 1997 via Wayback)
Weird	Gallery of the Absurd (Archived 5 December 1998 via Wayback)	The ONION (Archived 18 April 1997 via Wayback)

== Panelists ==
Whereas in later years the panelists were official members of International Academy of Digital Arts and Sciences, in 1997 the awards were chosen and given by IDG's The Web Magazine, which appointed a panel to judge the competition.

The panel of judges was:

Dean Andrews	Contributing writer, The Web Magazine
Spencer Ante	Associate editor, The Web Magazine
Justine Bateman	Star, Men Behaving Badly
Alex Bennett	Radio host
Jane Bosveld	Contributing writer, The Web Magazine; former editor at Ms, Omni, NetGuide
Lily Burana	Former editor in chief, Future Sex; The Web Magazine regular columnist
Ted Casablanca	E! Entertainment Television and E! Online gossip columnist
James Cury	Senior Associate Editor, The Web Magazine
The Eels	Rock band, DreamWorks Records
Ira Flatow	Executive Producer/Host, National Public Radio Science
Steve Fox	Editor-in-Chief, The Web Magazine
Angela Freeman	PC World Assistant Editor
Kurt Freytag	President, Lucid Dreams
David Futrelle	Editor, Salon
Lisa Goldman	President, Construct Internet Design
Michael Goodwin	Movie critic, computer journalist
Michael Gough	Editor in Chief, Sidewalk.com
Nina Hartley	Actress
Ean Hauts	Computer journalist
Glen Helfand	Freelance writer
Eric Hellweg	Contributing writer, The Web Magazine; Staff Editor, PC World
Marjorie Ingall	Freelance writer
Penn Jillette	Magician, performer
Amy Johns	Editor, Wired
Pagan Kennedy	Contributing Editor, The Web Magazine; author
Todd Lappin	Cyberrights Editor, Wired
Rob Levine	Music critic; contributing editor, The Web Magazine
Karen Libertore	Online Producer, MacWorld Online
Jennife McDonald	Literary Agent
Mark Meadows	Creative Director, Construct Internet Design
Pamela Mendels	Reporter, The New York Times CyberTimes
Sia Michel	Contributing editor, The Web Magazine; associate editor, Spin
Erika Milvy	Freelance writer
Lisa Palac	Founding Editor of Future Sex
Tony Perkin	Editor-in-Chief, Red Herring
David Pescovitz	Author, Editor
Adam Philips	Contributing Editor, The Web Magazine
Suzan Revah	Contributing editor, The Web Magazine; associate editor, American Journalism Review
Derk Richardson	Music, TV, and Film Critic
Henry Rosenthal	Film Producer
Bob Sabat	Managing Editor, SmartMoney
Nathan Schedroff	Creative Director, VIVID Studios
Leonard Shlain	Surgeon, Author
RU Sirius	Author; Cofounder of Mondo 2000
Howard Smukler	Attorney
J. Michael Straczynski	Creator and Producer of Babylon 5
Jennifer Sucov	Senior Editor, Folio
Eric Tyson	Contributing Editor, The Web Magazine; Syndicated columnist; Author
Laura Victoria	The Web Magazine Sex section Writer
Brad Wieners	Editor, HardWired
Bernie Yee	Author
Zak Zaidman	Founder, Gravity, Inc.
