= Home Page (film) =

- Directed by: Doug Block
- Produced by: Doug Block; Esther Robinson; Jane Weiner
- Release date: 1999
- Country: United States

Home Page is a 1999 documentary by Doug Block on the genesis of weblogs and the lives of early independent content producers on the Internet. It was filmed between 1996 and 1998. The film premiered at the Sundance Film Festival, and was released in limited theaters in New York City, while being made available on home video and on iFilm, simultaneously.

== Cast ==
The documentary focuses on the personal lives of some of the people involved with ground-breaking Internet sites of the time, including Justin's Links from the Underground, suck.com, Cybergrrl, HotWired, and Feed Magazine.

Personalities filmed in the documentary include:

- Justin Hall
- Sammi Quince
- Joey Anuff
- Carl Steadman
- Steven Johnson
- Stefanie Syman
- Jaime Levy
- Aliza Sherman
- Julie Peterson
- Howard Rheingold

== Reaction ==
Home Page was nominated for the Grand Jury Prize at the 1999 Sundance Film Festival. Roger Ebert named the movie his pick of the festival and the movie was named one of the best documentaries of the year by the Chicago Sun-Times.
