= Ars Technica =

Technology news website owned by Condé Nast

- Screenshot of the homepage of Ars Technica in December 2024
- Website type: Technology; Science; Geek culture
- Available in: English
- Owner: Condé Nast
- Creators: Ken Fisher; Jon Stokes
- Website: arstechnica.com
- Commercial: Yes
- Registration: Optional
- Launched: 1998; 28 years ago
- Current status: Online

Ars Technica (Note: /ˌɑːrz ˈtɛknɪkə/; a Latin-derived term that the site translates as the "art of technology", and sometimes known commonly as Ars) is a website covering news and opinions in technology, science, politics, and society, created by Ken Fisher and Jon Stokes in 1998. It publishes news, reviews, and guides on issues such as computer hardware and software, science, technology policy, and video games.

Ars Technica was privately owned until May 2008, when it was sold to Condé Nast Digital, the online division of Condé Nast Publications. Condé Nast purchased the site, along with two others, for $25 million and added it to the company's Wired Digital group, which also includes Wired and, formerly, Reddit. The staff mostly works from home and has offices in Boston, Chicago, London, New York City, and San Francisco.

The operations of Ars Technica are funded primarily by advertising, and it has offered a paid subscription service since 2001.

== History ==
Ken Fisher, who serves as the website's current editor-in-chief, and Jon Stokes created Ars Technica in 1998. Its purpose was to publish computer hardware and software-related news articles and guides; in their words, "the best multi-OS, PC hardware, and tech coverage possible while ... having fun, being productive, and being as informative and as accurate as possible". "Ars technica" is a Latin phrase that translates to "Art of Technology". The website published news, reviews, guides, and other content of interest to computer enthusiasts. Writers for Ars Technica were geographically distributed across the United States at the time; Fisher lived in his parents' house in Boston, Stokes in Chicago, and the other writers in their respective cities.

On May 19, 2008, Ars Technica was sold to Condé Nast Digital, the online division of Condé Nast Publications. (Note: Condé Nast Digital was named CondéNet at the time.) The sale was part of a purchase by Condé Nast Digital of three unaffiliated websites costing $25 million in total: Ars Technica, Webmonkey, and HotWired. Ars Technica was added to the company's Wired Digital group, which included Wired and Reddit. In an interview with The New York Times, Fisher said other companies offered to buy Ars Technica and the site's writers agreed to a deal with Condé Nast because they felt it offered them the best chance to turn their "hobby" into a business. Fisher, Stokes, and the eight other writers at the time were employed by Condé Nast. Layoffs at Condé Nast in November 2008 affected websites owned by the company "across the board", including Ars Technica.

On May 5, 2015, Ars Technica launched its United Kingdom site to expand its coverage of issues related to the UK and Europe. The UK site began with around 500,000 readers and had reached roughly 1.4 million readers a year after its launch. In September 2017, Condé Nast announced that it was significantly downsizing its Ars Technica UK arm, and laid off all but one member of its permanent editorial staff.

Since 2024, Condé Nast, Ars Technica's parent company, has entered a bilateral deal with OpenAI. The terms of this deal have not been publicly disclosed, but The Guardian reported that it is more than just access to Condé Nast publications and extends to the usage of AI in the news cycle to "ensure that as AI plays a larger role in news discovery and delivery, it maintains accuracy, integrity and respect for quality reporting".

On February 13, 2026, Ars Technica published an article on how an AI agent seemingly wrote a hit piece on a software maintainer after the maintainer rejected the agent's code. The article was retracted the same day after several of the quotes that were falsely attributed to the maintainer were found to be fabricated by AI. One of the journalists who wrote the article was subsequently fired from Ars Technica.

== Content ==
The content of articles published by Ars Technica has generally remained the same since its creation in 1998 and is categorized by four types: news, guides, reviews, and features. News articles relay current events. Ars Technica also hosts OpenForum, a free Internet forum for the discussion of a variety of topics.

Originally, most news articles published by the website were aggregated from other technology-related websites. Ars Technica provided short commentaries on the news, generally a few paragraphs, and a link to the original source. After being purchased by Condé Nast, Ars Technica began publishing more original news, investigating topics, and interviewing sources themselves. A significant portion of the news articles published there now are original. Relayed news is still published on the website, ranging from one or two sentences to a few paragraphs.

Ars Technica's features are long articles that go into great depth on their subject. For example, the site published a guide on CPU architecture in 1998 named "Understanding CPU caching and performance". An article in 2009 discussed in detail the theory, physics, mathematical proofs, and applications of quantum computers. The website's 18,000-word review of Apple's first iPad described everything from the product's packaging to the specific type of integrated circuits it uses.

Ars Technica is written in a less-formal tone than that found in a traditional journal. Many of the website's regular writers have postgraduate degrees, and many work for academic or private research institutions. Website cofounder Jon Stokes published the computer architecture textbook Inside The Machine in 2007; John Timmer performed postdoctoral research in developmental neurobiology; Until 2013, Timothy Lee was a scholar at the Cato Institute, a public-policy institute, which republished Ars Technica articles by him. Biology journal Disease Models & Mechanisms called Ars Technica a "conduit between researchers and the public" in 2008.

On September 12, 2012, Ars Technica recorded its highest daily traffic ever with its iPhone 5 event coverage. It recorded 15.3 million page views, 13.2 million of which came from its live blog platform of the event.

== Staff ==
Jennifer Ouelette, the former science editor of Gizmodo, contributes science and geek culture coverage. Beth Mole, who has a PhD in microbiology, handles Ars' health coverage. She was formerly at Science News. Eric Berger, formerly of the Houston Chronicle, covers space exploration.

John Timmer is the science editor for Ars. He formerly taught scientific writing and science journalism at Stony Brook University and Weill Cornell Medical College. He earned his undergraduate degree from Columbia University and his PhD from University of California, Berkeley and worked as a postdoc at Memorial Sloan Kettering.

Benj Edwards worked for Ars as senior AI reporter until March 2026, when he was fired over his role in the publication of a now-retracted article that included AI-generated quotes.

== Revenue ==
The cost of operating Ars Technica has always been funded primarily by advertising. Originally handled by Federated Media Publishing, selling advertising space on the website is now managed by Condé Nast. In addition to online advertising, Ars Technica has sold subscriptions to the website since 2001, now named Ars Pro and Ars Pro++ subscriptions (previously known as Ars Premier). Subscribers are not shown advertisements, and receive benefits including the ability to see exclusive articles, post in certain areas of the Ars Technica forum, and participate in live chat rooms with notable people in the computer industry. To a lesser extent, revenue is also collected from content sponsorship. A series of articles about the future of collaboration was sponsored by IBM, and the site's Exploring Datacenters section is sponsored by data-management company NetApp. Ars Technica also collects revenue from affiliate marketing by advertising deals and discounts from online retailers, and from the sale of Ars Technica-branded merchandise.

=== Advertisement block ===
On March 5, 2010, Ars Technica experimentally blocked readers who used Adblock Plus—one of several computer programs that stop advertisements from being displayed in a web browser—from viewing the website. Fisher estimated 40% of the website's readers had the software installed at the time. The next day, the block was lifted, and the article "Why Ad Blocking is devastating to the sites you love" was published on Ars Technica, imploring readers not to use the software on websites they care about:

... blocking ads can be devastating to the sites you love. I am not making an argument that blocking ads is a form of stealing, or is immoral, or unethical ... It can result in people losing their jobs, it can result in less content on any given site, and it definitely can affect the quality of content. It can also put sites into a real advertising death spin.

The block and article were controversial, generating articles on other websites about them, and the broader issue of advertising ethics. Readers of Ars Technica generally followed Fisher's persuasion; the day after his article was published, 25,000 readers who used the software had allowed the display of advertisements on Ars Technica in their browser, and 200 readers had subscribed to Ars Premier.

In February 2016, Fisher noted, "That article lowered the ad-block rate by 12 percent, and what we found was that the majority of people blocking ads on our site were doing it because other sites were irritating them". In response to increasing use of ad blockers, Ars Technica intends to identify readers who filter out advertisements and ask them to support the site by several means.

== See also ==
- Technology journalism
- Video game journalism
- Ars Electronica
