= John Burgan =

English-born documentary director

John Burgan FRSA (born in 1962 in London) is an independent documentary director and writer. Many of his films are themed around identity, sense of belonging, and migration.

Burgan is best known for his 1998 documentary essay Memory of Berlin. Sometimes autobiographical, sometimes observational, he takes the viewer on a search for identity, sharing his own roots as English adoptee as well as reflecting on the torn identity of the city he chose to live in: Berlin. The film was shown in many film festivals around the world and received the first prize at the Marseille festival "Vue sur les Docs". The film was repeatedly broadcast by ZDF and Arte. Selected commentary to "Memory of Berlin" was published in Grand Street.

In Friendly Enemy Alien Burgan asks: "Friends, enemies, aliens: is it possible to be all three at once? June 1940: Jewish refugees from Austria, Germany and Italy flee Hitler at the outbreak of the war and are given asylum in England, to be interned as suspected spies, shipped off on the HMT Dunera to Australia to endure months behind barbed wire deep in the outback."

Friendly Enemy Alien was first broadcast by ZDF in Germany in August 2006. The Daily Telegraph quotes John Burgan on his motives for making this film: "Refugees are invariably unwanted and unloved when they arrive, but being at the bottom of the heap they knuckle down and make the best of the chance they've been given, to become an asset to their adopted country."

Chris Marker said about John Burgan's work: "I guess it's about time for the First-Person film to become a genre by itself, and for historians to wonder why, as it had been at the roots of literature, it took so much time to the cinema to catch up. I don't take any risk at predicting Memory of Berlin will be considered as a milestone in the road of the film-essay." The film was included in the Planète Marker retrospective at the Pompidou Centre in Paris, December 2013.

== Biography ==
John Burgan grew up in Kingston upon Hull, East Yorkshire where he attended Hymers College. He read English Language and Literature at Newcastle University from 1981 to 1984, then worked as a picture editor at the BBC before attending the National Film and Television School from 1989 to 1992. He was chosen by Richard Attenborough to receive the Student Award attached to his own 1992 Shakespeare Prize (Alfred Toepfer Stiftung F.V.S.). Previous recipients include director Sam Mendes.

In 1992, Burgan moved to Berlin and was awarded a Nipkow Programme Fellowship to develop the documentary essay, Memory of Berlin, completed in 1998.

In Berlin, Burgan worked as a writer, director and editor and also taught documentary and media production at the Berlin University of the Arts and also served as guest professor, giving workshops at the University of Fine Arts, Hamburg and Istanbul Bilgi University, Istanbul. He was artist-in-residence at the Villa Aurora Los Angeles in 2003. From 2005 till 2018 he joined Doug Block and Ben Kempas in hosting The D-Word, an online community for documentary filmmakers.

John Burgan is the author of entries on Robert Vas, Jean-Pierre Gorin and The Back of Beyond in the Encyclopaedia of the Documentary Film edited by Ian Aitken.

Burgan's Friendly Enemy Alien received "Best Documentary" at the "Achtung Berlin New Berlin Film Awards" in 2006.

John Burgan taught the documentary course at the European Film College in Ebeltoft, Denmark for two years from 2006 before returning to the United Kingdom to take up a teaching and research post at Aberystwyth University in 2008. A Fellow of the Royal Society of Arts, he was Visiting Fellow at the University of South Wales and is once again based in the German capital. He works at the Nipkow Programm and has also worked for Met Film School, Berlin, the ZeLIG School for Documentary, Television and New Media as well as the IDM Film Fund in Bolzano, Italy.

== Films ==
- Chekhov's Close Ups: Swinton & Szábó (1995)
- Memory of Berlin (1998)
- Behind Words (2005)
- Friendly Enemy Alien (2006)
- Power and Place (2010)

He also worked as a consultant on Memories of Rain (2004) and Cinemania (2002). He is credited as "John 'The Godfather' Burgan" on the latter.
