= Automatic Media =

Former web content site

Automatic Media was a web content site in 2000 to 2001.

== Foundation ==
Automatic Media was created in July 2000 as a joint venture between Suck and Feed, two online magazines, after the publications had raised $4 million in venture capital financing from Lycos Ventures LP. Automatic Media's first acquisition was Alt.culture, an online encyclopedia of alternative culture focused primarily on internet fads. Automatic Media allowed its member sites to use a shared advertising sales force, technologies, and administrative resources. The sites maintained distinctive brand names and editorial voices, but engaged in heavy cross-linking and advertising for their partner sites. In January 2001, Automatic Media announced its first original venture, Plastic.com. Plastic sought to minimize operational costs by running entirely on user-contributed stories. Its staff initially consisted of four people.

== Demise ==
Less than a year after its foundation, Automatic Media's subsidiaries declared bankruptcy, citing "an inability to secure additional financing". Feed and Suck both announced that they were firing their staffs, and would no longer produce content. It was also announced that Plastic would continue with a skeleton staff working pro bono, although its fate was uncertain until bought by one of suck's original founders Carl Steadman.

== Impact ==
Automatic Media's echoed the failure of many other web content sites. The failure of these sites disproved the common notion that the World Wide Web would make it easy for independent media sites to publish and distribute content for cheap compared with the cost of putting out print magazines. Combined with the questions raised by other dot-com collapses, investors were now questioning whether advertising alone could sustain the enormous and often underestimated costs of producing and hosting original material.
