= Richard Kadrey =

American novelist

- Born: New York City, New York, U.S.
- Occupations: Novelist, writer, photographer
- Writing career
- Language: English

Richard Kadrey is an American novelist, freelance writer, and photographer based in Pittsburgh, Pennsylvania.

== Fiction ==
Kadrey has written nineteen novels, including fifteen New York Times Best Sellers. Kadrey's other works include collaborative graphic novels and over 50 published short stories.

=== Sandman Slim series ===
The first Sandman Slim novel was published in 2009. The story's main character, James "Sandman Slim" Stark, escapes from Hell to take his revenge on the people that killed his lover. He wanders a dark Los Angeles haunted by vampires and demons. After 11 years of combat as a gladiator against demons in Hell, he is more than prepared to fight back. Further Sandman Slim novels were published between 2010 and 2021.

In 2016, it was reported that Studio 8 acquired the rights to the series and were hoping to launch a franchise. In February 2018, it was announced that Chad Stahelski would be directing an adaptation of the first novel, with Kerry Williamson set to write the latest draft of the script.

=== Metrophage ===
Metrophage, first published in 1988, is a cyberpunk novel set in a dystopic future Los Angeles. It has been referred to in reviews as "one of the quintessential 1980s cyberpunk novels".

=== Dead Set ===
On October 29, 2013, Kadrey released Dead Set, a novel dealing with an uninvited presence that has entered dreams of Zoe and her lost brother Valentine.

=== "Carbon Copy: Meet the First Human Clone" ===
Kadrey's short story "Carbon Copy: Meet the First Human Clone" was filmed as After Amy, a 2001 made-for-television movie starring Bridget Fonda.

== Non-fiction ==
Kadrey's non-fiction books as a writer and/or editor include The Catalog of Tomorrow (2002), From Myst to Riven (1997), The Covert Culture Sourcebook and its sequel (1993 and 1994).

Kadrey hosted a live interview show on HotWired in the 1990s called Covert Culture. He was an editor at print magazines Shift and Future Sex, and at online magazines Signum and Stim. He has published articles about art, culture and technology in publications including Wired, Omni, Mondo 2000, the San Francisco Chronicle, SF Weekly, Ear, Artforum, ArtByte, Bookforum, World Art, Whole Earth Review, Reflex, Science Fiction Eye, Street Tech, and Interzone.

Kadrey was the co-founder of the now-defunct Dead Media Project along with cyberpunk author and futurist Bruce Sterling.

== Publications ==
=== Sandman Slim series ===
- Sandman Slim (2009)
- Kill The Dead (2010)
- Aloha from Hell (2011)
- "Devil in the Dollhouse" (short story, 2012)
- Devil Said Bang (2012)
- Kill City Blues (2013)
- The Getaway God (2014)
- Killing Pretty (2015)
- The Perdition Score (2016)
- The Kill Society (2017)
- Hollywood Dead (2018)
- Ballistic Kiss (2020)
- King Bullet (2021)
- In The Devil Wind (2026)

=== Coop novels ===
- The Everything Box (2016)
- The Wrong Dead Guy (2017)

=== Other novels ===
- Metrophage (1988)
- Kamikaze L'Amour: A Novel of the Future (1995)
- Butcher Bird: A Novel of the Dominion (2007)
- Dead Set (2013)
- The Grand Dark (2019)
- The Dead Take the A Train (with Cassandra Khaw) (2023)

=== Other works ===
- Carbon Copy: Meet 'The First Human Clone' (short story, 1998)
- The Pale House Devil (novella, 2023)
- The Secrets of Insects (short stories, 2023)
