= Unit Five Seven =

Unit Five Seven was an independent filmmaking collective formed in 1957 by English filmmaker Michael Grigsby and a few friends (almost all technicians at Granada Television in Manchester). Together they produced a handful of short films between 1958 and the mid-1960s. Members of Unit Five Seven included Andrew Hall, Christopher Faulds, Euan Halleron, Eric Harrison, Geoffrey Holmes, Jack Robinson, Michael Sale, Herb Taylor, Ian Thompson, Peter Walker, Claude Whatham, Elizabeth Ashman, Brian Cosgrove, Maurice Askew, Ian Thompson, Peter Plummer, Ivan Hall and Robert Vas.

Unit Five Seven filming Enginemen

In Grigsby's own words, the Unit was "trying to take over where Free Cinema left off".

Unit Five Seven produced Michael Grigsby's documentaries Enginemen (1959) and Tomorrow’s Saturday, Canary, a short animated film directed by Brian Cosgrove and Maurice Askew, Dirty Old Town, directed by Ian Thompson and Peter Plummer, The Vanishing Street and Finale, directed by Robert Vas, and Solo, directed by Ivan Hall. The Unit was helped financially by the British Film Institute's Experimental Film Fund.
