= Birch Street =

Birch Street may refer to:

- 51 Birch Street, 2005 documentary by Doug Block
- Maryland Route 173
