= The Humble Guys =

1990s IBM PC cracking group

- Formation: 1980s
- Headquarters: None (digital group)

The Humble Guys (THG) were a cracking group for the IBM PC during the late 1980s founded by two friends known by the pseudonyms Candyman and Fabulous Furlough. The group was also noticed in the demoscene for some of their cracktros.

THG was the first group to make use of the NFO file as a means for documenting their releases before packaging and distribution. The first release to contain an .NFO file was Nova Logic's remake of the arcade classic Bubble Bobble in 1989. This has since spawned an entire generation of ASCII artists devoted solely to creating artwork for the purpose of decorating NFO files for warez groups. To put things into perspective, there are now entire websites explicitly devoted to the collection and archival of NFO files, such as The iSONEWS.

== Software contributions ==
Screenshot from the THG cracktro READTHG.EXE featuring The Humble Thug.

THG also was one of the first groups to release an "intro tool" for the IBM PC demoscene, released by their coding subsidiary, THG F/X, called the THG IntroMaker. The THG IntroMaker would allow one to create a self-contained executable program which played music and displayed graphics on screen without the need for any knowledge of computer programming. A much more advanced and highly sophisticated extension of this today would be Farbrausch's .werkkzeug.

Prior to THG's arrival on the warez scene the IBM world did not have anything other than text based intros usually quoting song lyrics. THG members brought the experience from the C64 and AMIGA warez scene bringing the first animated and graphical intros to the IBM scene.

In December 1991, the "F/X division" of The Humble Guys released a first and only copy of an electronic magazine called "The Humble Review" featuring game reviews and articles. Writer and weblogger Justin Hall would have his first article published in the Humble Review; a film review of Akira by "Fusty".

Members of THG also had their own custom BBS software, originally a "forum hack", called L.S.D. BBS (Lush Software Designs) which was first introduced on June 1, 1990, written by The Slavelord, Niteman and others. The original source code for this was Emulex/2, which was acquired by a THG member whose alias was Tripin Face. The source code was referred to as 'Jani' in some communities at the time.

== In the news ==
On the evening of October 27, 1992, NBC aired an episode about computer hackers on Dateline titled "Are Your Secrets Safe?". This show prominently displayed ads for several warez BBSes, including one for The Slave Den BBS which was operated by a senior member and spokesperson of THG. As a result of this undesired exposure, The Slavelord voluntarily retired from his activities within the group.

On September 5, 2006, David J. Francis, known by his username "Candyman" died in his hometown of St. Louis, Missouri, of heart failure.

On October 4, 2015, Pierre Barkett, known by his username "The PieMaN" died in Florida of heart failure.

== Competition ==
THG redefined the manner in which the PC warez scene worked when they entered the scene in 1989. Prior to THG, warez releases were haphazard, with multiple groups releasing the same title, usually after the title had been available in retail stores for weeks. Often games were released to BBSes without being cracked. THG changed this by releasing titles days before the software made it to retail chains such as Babbage's. They did this by establishing relationships with the major wholesale software distributors, and ordering games with overnight shipping. For those cases where overnight shipping wasn't enough, THG found people who lived near the software companies, who could go to the company, and buy the game the day it was released. This beat the overnight shipping method by 2 days in most cases. Also, an advantage that they possessed was that most other warez groups were run by teens, who attended school during the day. THG was run by professional men, who were available each day "by 10:30" when FedEx, or UPS delivered. The other groups had to "wait until they got home" in the afternoons. A decided advantage considering most "cracks" were done in less than an hour, and releases complete shortly thereafter.

THG had members who worked for morning TV shows. Software companies, ever eager for free advertising, would send a box of new, or in some cases "about to be released" software to a TV show, for just a simple phone call. They also understood the "progression" of software. Once a title was completed, the box, manual, and final version of the game were shipped to a "duplication house" to copy the software for sale in stores. THG had contacts in these duplication houses, where they could get the games weeks before they would show up at the store. Activision's F-14 Tomcat was one such title, along with all titles from MicroProse.

At the height of their power, THG had game suppliers in the US (country wide), UK (Leeds), France, Germany, and many parts of Asia.

THG introduced the concept of couriers in an effort to plaster their releases on their competitors' BBSes. The couriers were often told to make sure that the various groups received the latest crack on their HQ's BBS before other THG BBSes. The combination of using software wholesalers and couriers turned the PC Warez Scene upside down in 1990, but these are considered normal practice now. The fierce competition within the current warez and video scenes are directly descended from THG.

As a result, the majority of older, well established, warez groups disappeared from the scene. Of the four or five groups that were around prior to THG's arrival in December 1989, the only group that remained was the International Network of Crackers (INC), which was one of THG's greatest competitors in the IBM PC cracking scene. The file header of the executable THG cracktro, READTHG.EXE (displayed above), contains text which reads: "Cool Hand but fucks his dog and Phantom from INC" (sic), an insulting reference towards the vice-president and courier coordinator of their rival organization, INC.

After Candyman shut down his BBS (Candyland, originally run on CNET BBS), setup, development, maintenance and unique customization were continued by The Maker who was on hand from day one. After Candyman left the United States, Fabulous Furlough took over the reins of the group. After political infighting among the remaining members of the group led to problems within the organization, several of the newer members of THG splintered off and formed a new group called USA (United Software Association) which included several noteworthy members such as, Niteman, Genesis and The Humble Babe (who changed her name to The Not So Humble Babe upon her departure from THG). USA released a few games, most of them coming from one of THG's suppliers in Illinois, whom USA had managed to "turn". After the bust of The Not So Humble Babe on credit card fraud charges in Michigan, USA teamed up with the European PC warez division of Fairlight and were cooperatively known as "USA/FLT". This inevitably lead to the two groups USA and THG warring with each other

A year after the USA/FLT fiasco, several of the original members of The Humble Guys left the group in an effort to once again capture lightning in a bottle. However, by the fall of 1992 several other groups, such as Razor 1911, had joined the scene and this new group, while having some brief success, was never as successful as THG. The new group fell apart shortly after The Slavelord shut down his BBS after the Dateline story.

During 1992 though early 1994, many THG releases were cracked by the UK branch which consisted of Hi. T. Moonweed, Bryn Rogers and Hydro, who struggled to keep the group together due to US burnout. The UK BBSes, The Flying Teapot (known as active from 1991-1992) and The Demons Forge (ran by Hi.T and Bryn respectively) became the UK's major landmarks.

By 1994, most of the founding members of The Humble Guys were no longer involved with the warez scene. After the Pits BBS in New York was shut down by Novell in 1995, the group moved to IRC and had a presence on many different servers with the name #THG. They focused on distribution rather than cracking. The Humble Guys disbanded in the early 2000s when the last founding member left.
