= Disinformation (company) =

American publishing company

The Disinformation Company
- Company type: Private limited
- Founded: September 13, 1996
- Headquarters: New York City, New York, United States
- Key people: Gary Baddeley, President / CEO; Matt Staggs, Web content editor, podcast host
- Products: Multimedia Publishing and Distribution
- Website: disinfo.com

The Disinformation Company Ltd. (abbreviated as Disinfo) was a privately held, limited American publishing company until 2012 when it was sold to Red Wheel/Weiser/Conari. It also owned Disinformation Books, which focused on current affairs titles and books exposing alleged conspiracy theories, occultism, politics, news oddities, and purported disinformation. It was headquartered in New York City, New York. Arguably, its most visible publications to date are 50 Things You're Not Supposed to Know and the Everything You Know About [subject] Is Wrong series, both by the company's editor-at-large Russ Kick.

== History ==
In 1996, Tele-Communications Inc. (now Comcast) funded a Hollywood-based Internet initiative responsible for online projects like the Getty Museum and an Internet-based political humor soap opera entitled Candidate 96. The initiative launched its own interactive website, featuring the tag line; "everything you know is wrong". Soon after the site's launch, TCI cancelled funding and support for the site.

The founding team kept it going, being nominated for an award for politics in the first Webby Awards ceremony. The Disinformation Company, as it was now known, was then acquired by Razorfish. Eventually, the Disinformation Company became privately held.

In addition to publishing books, the company also had a home video division as well as multimedia and Internet projects.

In 2000, Disinfo organized DisinfoCon, a 12-hour event featuring Richard Metzger, rock musician Marilyn Manson, underground filmmaker Kenneth Anger, painter Joe Coleman, Douglas Rushkoff, Mark Pesce, Grant Morrison, Robert Anton Wilson, Todd Brendan Fahey and others.

In 2002, the company produced a four-episode documentary series called Disinformation (also alternatively titled as Disinfo Nation).

In 2008, the Disinformation Company itself was accused of spreading propaganda (such as 9/11 "Truth" material) by Louis Proyect.

As of June 17, 2020, the Disinfo.com website was inactive. While the Disinformation Company Ltd. was still listed as the owner, all content was deleted and the domain was for sale.

== Documentary films ==
- Disinformation: The Complete Series (2004)
- Outfoxed: Rupert Murdoch's War on Journalism (2004)
- Uncovered: The Whole Truth About the Iraq War (2004)
- Bush Family Fortunes: The Best Democracy Money Can Buy (2004)
- Wal-Mart: The High Cost of Low Price (2005)
- This Divided State (2005)
- Gay Republicans (2005)
- American Jobs (2005)
- Iraq for Sale: The War Profiteers (2006)
- The Big Buy: Tom DeLay's Stolen Congress (2006)
- 9/11: Press for Truth (2006)
- American Blackout (2006)
- Endgame: Blueprint for Global Enslavement (2007)
- Let's All Hate Toronto: A Comic Adventure into Canada's Love/Hate Relationship with Itself (2007)
- War Made Easy: How Presidents and Pundits Keep Spinning Us to Death (2008)
- The Mindscape of Alan Moore (2008)
- Slacker Uprising (2008)
- New World Order (2009)
- RiP!: A Remix Manifesto (2009)
- Cargo 200 (2009)
- Rethink Afghanistan (2009)

== Books ==
- Turn Off Your Mind: The Mystic Sixties and the Dark Side of the Age of Aquarius by Gary Lachman (2003)
- The Passover Plot: Special 40th Anniversary Edition by Hugh J. Schonfield (2005)
