= Pirates with Attitudes =

Former warez organization

Pirates With Attitudes
- PWA ASCII art logo by R.Noble of MiRAGE
- Formation: Early 1990s
- Purpose: Warez / Cracking
- Location: International
- Origin: New York
- Founders: Orion; BarManager
- Affiliations: International Network of Crackers

Pirates With Attitudes (PWA) was a major international warez release group between 1992 and 2000. The group was established by two former International Network of Crackers members known by the pseudonyms Orion and BarManager. PWA was also very well known during the tail end of the BBS-era for their development of modifications and enhancements ("mods") for the PCBoard BBS software.

On May 4, 2000, the United States Department of Justice released a press report stating that conspiracy and copyright infringement charges had been brought against several members of PWA under the NET Act (No Electronic Theft Act). The day after the DOJ's report, PWA released a .nfo file officially announcing their retirement. PWA was one of the first groups ever to be prosecuted under this act of law.

== Members ==
Alleged members of Pirates with Attitudes according to U.S. Department of Justice:

- Robin Rothberg, aka "Marlenus," (9/11/67) 32, of Newburyport, Massachusetts (pleaded guilty)
- Mark Veerboken, aka "Shiffie," of Belgium
- Steven Ahnen, aka "Code3," (4/13/58) 42, of Sarasota, Florida (pleaded guilty)
- Christian Morley, aka "Mercy" (4/13/73) 27, of Salem, Massachusetts (convicted)
- Justin Robbins, aka "Warlock," (2/10/76), 24, of Lake Station, Indiana (pleaded guilty)
- Jason Slater, aka "Technic," (4/28/70) 30, of Sunnyvale, California (pleaded guilty)
- Todd Veillette, aka "Gizmo," (11/21/59) 40, of Oakdale, Connecticut (pleaded guilty)
- Thomas Oliver, aka "RAMBONE," (7/14/65) 34, of Aurora, Illinois (pleaded guilty)
- Mark Stone, aka "Stoned," (3/24/66) 34, of California (pleaded guilty)
- Dionne, aka "akasha", of West Palm Beach, Florida (pleaded guilty)
- Shawn Reimerdes, aka "SkaTeMasTer", of Queens, New York
- Chowdery, real name unknown
- James Tinner, aka inspector gadget, Spokane WA
