= Abingdon Film Unit =

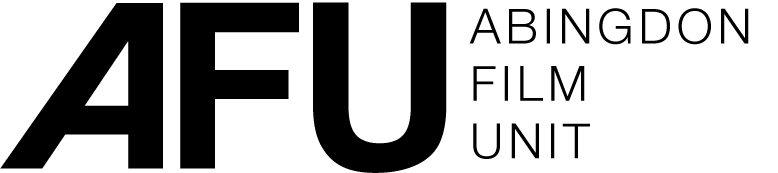
- Founded: 2003
- Founders: Michael Grigsby, Jeremy Taylor
- Headquarters: Abingdon, England
- Website: http://www.abingdonfilmunit.com/

The Abingdon Film Unit (known as the AFU) is an organisation based at Abingdon School, Abingdon-on-Thames, in Oxfordshire, England that enables pupils to make their own short documentary, animated, and live-action fiction films under the guidance of industry professionals. The AFU was formed in 2003 by British documentary maker Michael Grigsby and the school's former Head of Drama, Jeremy Taylor. They led the Unit together until Grigsby's death at the age of 76 in March 2013. The Film Unit has had several films selected for screening at the National Film Theatre in London and others added to the National Film Archive.

== Profile ==
The Unit's tutors have included BAFTA winning directors Jonas Mortensen (cinematography) and Colin O'Toole (direction), Mikkel Eriksen and Larry Sider (sound design), Nikolaj Larsen and Arvid Eriksson (editing), Rebekah Tolley, Duncan Pickstock, Matt Copson and Michael Bicarregui (direction), and animators Joanna Harrison and Geoff Dunbar. The Unit has so far produced over 200 short films, many of which have won prizes or received screenings at festivals in the UK and abroad. The influence of Grigsby's distinctive philosophy and aesthetic - using the medium of film "to give voice to the voiceless", explore "the poetry of the everyday" and allow audiences time and space in which to make their own judgements about the material - are often discernible in AFU documentaries, whilst AFU animations celebrate a hand-drawn or hand-made approach. The Unit encourages students to adopt the highest standards, and to develop their ideas through a process of careful research and reflection that seeks to clarify at every stage the aims and intentions of their films.

== Acclaim ==
Many of the Unit's films have been screened at the BFI Southbank (National Film Theatre) in London. There have also been screenings at the Dinard Festival of British Cinema in France and at the BUFF festival of young people's film in Malmo, Sweden. AFU films have won first prize at the Oxdox International Film Festival, the New Shoots Festival, the BFI Future Film Festival and the Bradford Animation Festival. The AFU has come to the attention of the press on several occasions through articles in, among others, the Times Educational Supplement, Vertigo magazine and Sight and Sound. Its members have also featured in local television and radio broadcasts.

== Larger projects ==
Two large-scale films have been made, one in Cambodia called 'Gravel and Stones' and the other in Moldova, called 'One Foot on the Ground'. Gravel and Stones was a thirty-minute film about the experience of disabled people in Cambodia called 'Gravel and Stones', made by Edward Hofman and Ben Hollins (directors), Tom Wakeling (cinematography), Andrew Mcgrath (sound recordist) and Suon Rottana (research and translation). It premiered at the BFI Southbank in November 2007 ahead of outings the following year at Raindance and LIDF. The film examines the devastating effects of land mines on the people of Cambodia, and was made with support of an NGO called Landmine Disability Support or LMDS. In 2009, the AFU produced another half-hour documentary called 'One Foot On The Ground'. This also premiered at BFI Southbank before screenings at Raindance and a new festival pioneered by the AFU in collaboration with the Westminster branch of the United Nations Association called 'We The People'. This film, made by Matt Copson (director, editor), Tom Bateman (camera) and William McDowell (sound), follows a promising young basketball player in Moldova called Andreii as he struggles to choose between staying in his native country - one of the poorest in Europe - or, like so many of his friends, moving away to pursue his dream of playing basketball professionally in another country.

== Screenings ==
The Film Unit holds annual screenings consisting of projects curated over the past year. These take place in the school's Amey Theatre and are open to the public free of charge and are often attended by a number of film industry professionals.

== See also ==
List of Old Abingdonians
