= Carl Steadman =

American web publisher

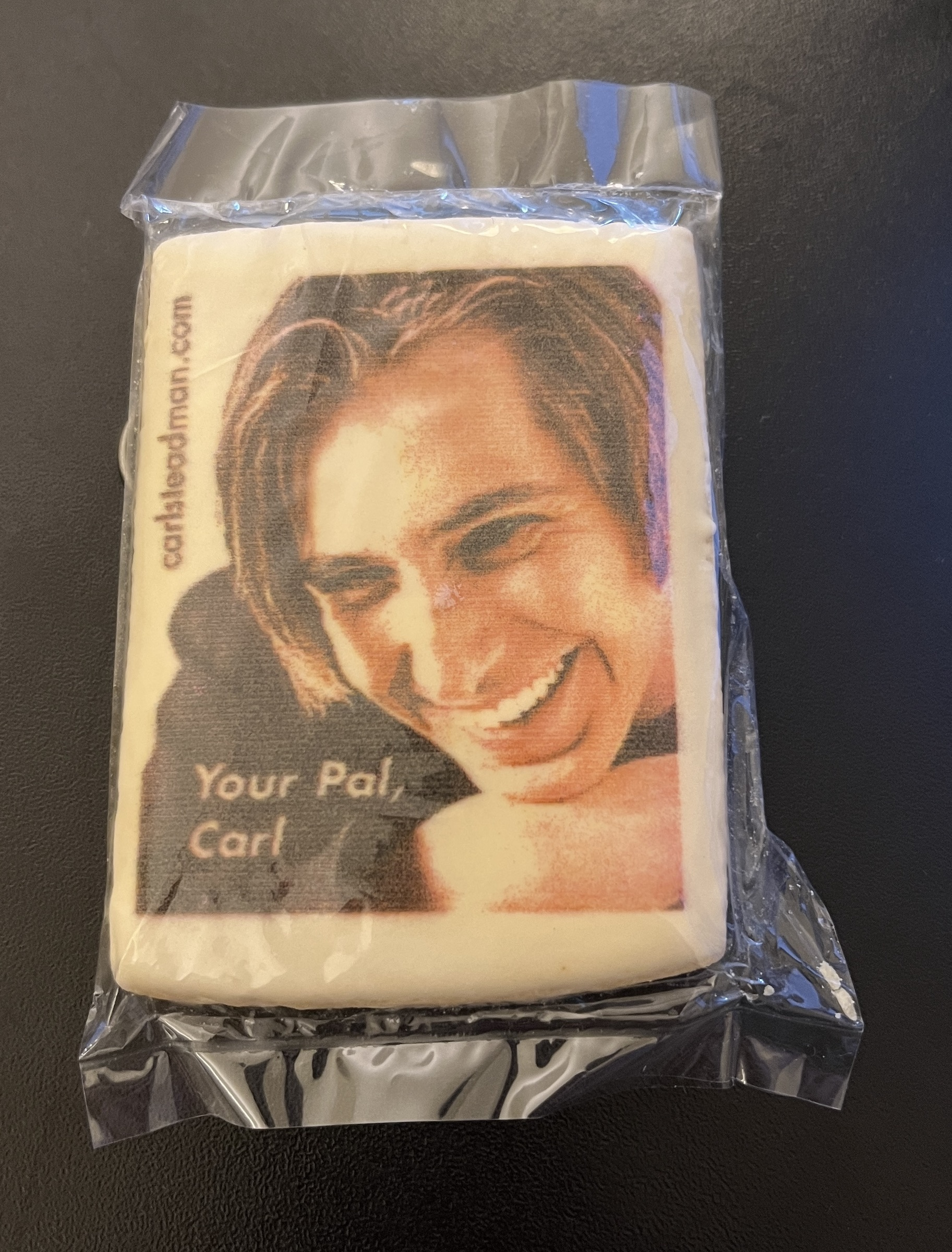
- 2023 photograph of an original plastic-bagged cookie created by Carl Steadman in 1999 and sold through his site
- Born: May 30, 1970; Richmond, California, US
- Known for: co-founder of suck.com

Carl Steadman is the co-founder of Suck.com and the creator of several pieces of early web-savvy literature. He is the former operator of Plastic.com.

He was also production director for HotWired, and appeared in the 1999 documentary Home Page.

== Works ==
- Placing - "Placing doesn't depict the future so much as portray the present"
- Rats To Cats!
- "Two Solitudes", a 1995 e-mail story
- Carl's "tilde site" at Freedonia
- Steadman wrote an untitled essay about leaving Suck.com, published on the Rox website in July 1996.
