= Foreverland (book) =

2022 memoir by Heather Havrilesky

Foreverland: On the Divine Tedium of Marriage
- Author: Heather Havrilesky
- Language: English
- Subject: Memoir
- Publisher: Ecco Press
- Publication date: February 8, 2022
- Pages: 304
- ISBN: 978-0-06-298446-3

Foreverland: On the Divine Tedium of Marriage is a 2022 memoir by Heather Havrilesky.
