= The Heck with Hollywood! =

1991 film

The Heck With Hollywood!
- Directed by: Doug Block
- Written by: Doug Block
- Produced by: Doug Block
- Starring: Gerry Cook
- Cinematography: Doug Block
- Edited by: Deborah Rosenberg
- Release date: 1991
- Running time: 57 minutes
- Country: United States
- Language: English

The Heck With Hollywood! is a 1991 American documentary film about independent film, directed by Doug Block.

== Cast ==
- Gerry Cook - Himself
- Jennifer Fox - Herself
- Peter M. Hargrove - Distributor shaking hands at elevator
- Ted Lichtenfeld - Himself
