= Richard Metzger =

American television host

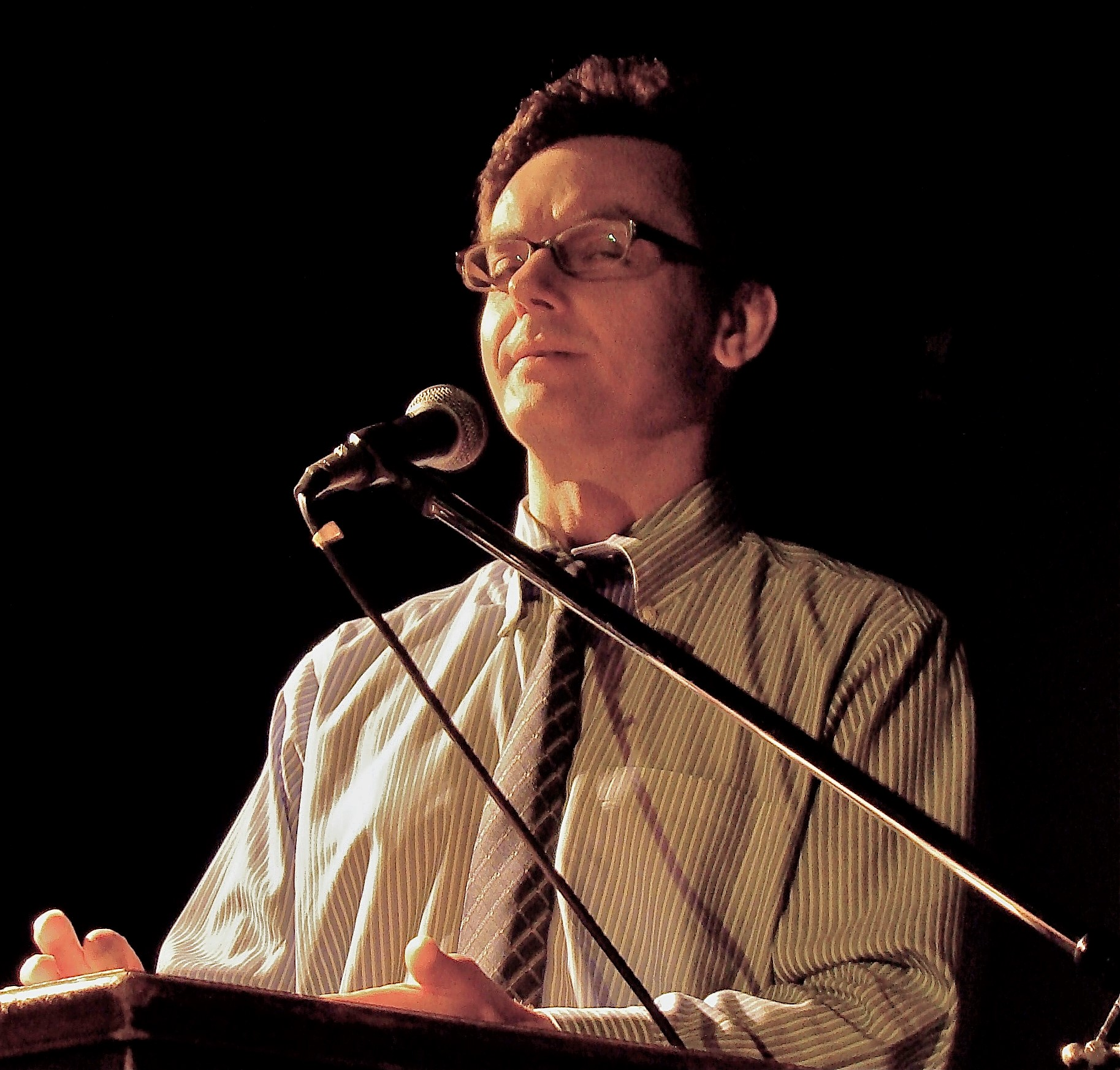
- Born: Wheeling, West Virginia

Richard Metzger is a television host and author. He was the host of the TV show Disinformation (United Kingdom Channel 4, 2000–01), The Disinformation Company and its website, Disinfo.com.

== Career ==
Metzger was the host of the TV show Disinformation, which aired for two seasons (2000 and 2001) on Channel 4 in the UK as part of their late night "4Later" programming block.

Metzger was the creative director of the "Disinformation" website in 1996. He later regained control of the intellectual property rights and an investment of over a million dollars by the site's original backer, cable giant Tele-Communications Inc.
