= Future Sex (magazine) =

US magazine

- Issue 2 cover
- Editor: Lisa Palac
- Categories: Sex, Technology
- Frequency: Quarterly
- First issue: 1992
- Final issue Number: July 1994; 7
- Company: Kundalini Publishing
- Country: United States
- Based in: San Francisco, California
- Language: English
- ISSN: 1061-6977
- OCLC: 25405919

Future Sex was a 1990s magazine based in San Francisco, California and published by Kundalini Publishing. The magazine was glossy with four-color printing and featured articles, interviews, reviews, erotica, and erotic photography celebrating the zeitgeist of technological revolution, body modification, sexual liberation, and the mainstreaming of sexual proclivities previously considered taboo—from bondage to fetishes to "teledildonics." Future Sex was a shortlived magazine, and only seven issues were published.

According to Jack Boulware from Salon, "Future Sex epitomized creative, offbeat, kinky, goofy, pro-sex San Francisco." On the other hand, the magazine was criticized by many insiders on the emerging cyberculture scene and on the San Francisco sex-positive scene for being too mainstream considering its subject matter; as Boing Boing founder and Net Chicks author Carla Sinclair put it, "The women are attractive...and the pictures are artistic. So if that's all they are going for, and if that's all the readers are expecting, then great. No problem. But do we need yet another magazine with the same old brand of nude looks and poses? Why play it so safe?"

The founding editor-in-chief for one issue was John Shirley. Lisa Palac, who also made contributions to the 3-D sound erotica album Cyborgasm followed after Shirley's short reign in the position. Writer, dancer, and Taste of Latex founding editor Lily Burana took over the helm following Palac. Other editors appearing on the masthead included Richard Kadrey and Tiffany Lee Brown.
