= The Nethernet =

Online game

The Nethernet (previously known as PMOG, the Passively Multiplayer Online Game) was an online game in which players "passively" participated in while browsing web pages. Players earn data points by taking missions, which they can spend on various game items that could be attached to web pages to trigger events when another player next visited that page.

The game was launched as PMOG in 2007 and underwent changes in 2009 to be rebranded as the Nethernet, although this was not completely successful and the game was shut down from August until coming back online in December 31st of that year. In its last iteration, the game would be online for some time, until it was finally shut down an unknown time after that.

During the 12th Annual Interactive Achievement Awards, the Academy of Interactive Arts & Sciences nominated PMOG for "Massively Multiplayer Game of the Year".

== Origins ==
One of the founding creators of The Nethernet was Justin Hall. In 2007, as a graduate student in USC's Interactive Media Division program, he developed the game concept as part of his masters thesis. The game led to the formation of GameLayers, Inc. with Nethernet co-creators Duncan Gough, and Merci Victoria Grace. A very early public version of the game was created with support from Alice Taylor and Phil Gyford. The game had an alpha release on February 5, 2007, with initial funding coming from the BBC, who were interested in exploring the potential for passive online gaming to teach web literacy. In May 2007, the game had 700 users.

The game was known as PMOG until March 2009, where it was rebranded and relaunched as The Nethernet until August 2009. At that time, the site was shut down, due to expense issues.

On December 31, 2009, Gamelayers, Inc., reported the return of The Nethernet and the game went back online. Until it went offline some unknown time after that.

== Game experience ==
The premise of The Nethernet came from the fact that internet users spend a large portion of their time multitasking, browsing information, or contacting other people online. The Nethernet aimed to classify and allocate an individual’s internet use and then utilize the gathered information in a unique and playful manner.

The Nethernet was originally an in-browser toolbar that compensated users as they browsed the World Wide Web. The game evolved as a heads-up display overlay in the Firefox web browser. The design of the HUD and its interface allowed users to play with one another via the World Wide Web. In addition, it allowed players to create information quests, complete missions created by other users, place "mines" throughout the web to trip up other users, and place and follow "portals" to other websites.

By engaging through features of the HUD and through increased web browsing, players lose or gain data points. Data points allow users to buy different types of tools which can enhance the previously mentioned features of the HUD. In addition, accumulated data points allow users to select a character type. In total, there are six characters: three fall under the category of "Chaotic", whose roles are to place numerous mines, vengeance weapons which prevent mine use, called "St. Nicks", and create portals. The other three abide by the "Torch of Order" and concentrate on protecting other users and providing them useful information through missions, also known as "quests".

Nethernet players can also collect achievement badges from the missions they completed, the manner in which they utilized their tools, or the web sites they visited.

== See also ==
- Web Annotation
