= International Network of Crackers =

Former warez organization

- Formation: Late 1980s
- Dissolved: Early 1990s
- Purpose: Warez / Cracking
- Location: United States
- Founders: Line Noise / Cool Hand
- Key people: Neil Kusens & Joseph Friedman
- Affiliations: Pirates With Attitude

International Network of Crackers (INC) was one of the premier cracking/releasing warez groups for the IBM PC during the late 1980s and early 1990s.

The formation of INC was the result of the merger of several cracking groups, including Union, based out of Texas, and the Miami Cracking Machine (MCM), based out of Florida. The founder of MCM, who went under the pseudonym Line Noise, continued to manage INC until 1992. Following his departure from the group, Cool Hand and The Cracksmith took over. There were a few years in which the group seemed dominant over the "warez" scene. It was not until internal conflicts and lack of interest by upper management entered the picture that things began to decline. When Cool Hand and The Cracksmith disappeared, the remaining members were unable to hold things together.

The real identities of the key members have never been fully uncovered, but it has been reported that the founding members, Line Noise (Neil), The Cracksmith (Drew), and Cool Hand (Joe) have left the scene. Releases from INC aggressively declined and people within the scene generally had felt that INC lost its edge. During a one-year period, they went from being the top gaming software release group to barely memorable. Some of the best games of the 80s and 90s were released by INC during a period of stiff competition with groups like FLT, THG, and Razor 1911. By early 1994, INC had completely disappeared from the warez scene.

Among their biggest rivals and competitors during the group's existence were The Humble Guys. During a period in which most groups were using any and all means possible (including credit card fraud, lies, and anything else) to beat them, INC always maintained its moral high ground. The worst INC ever did was to "leak" a new game to The Humble Guys so they could steal the credit. While unknown to THG - the game was infected with a trojan that searched for a modem then dialed 9-1-1. Several of The Humble Guys members were visited by the police before they discovered they had been fooled.
