= Heather Havrilesky =

American author

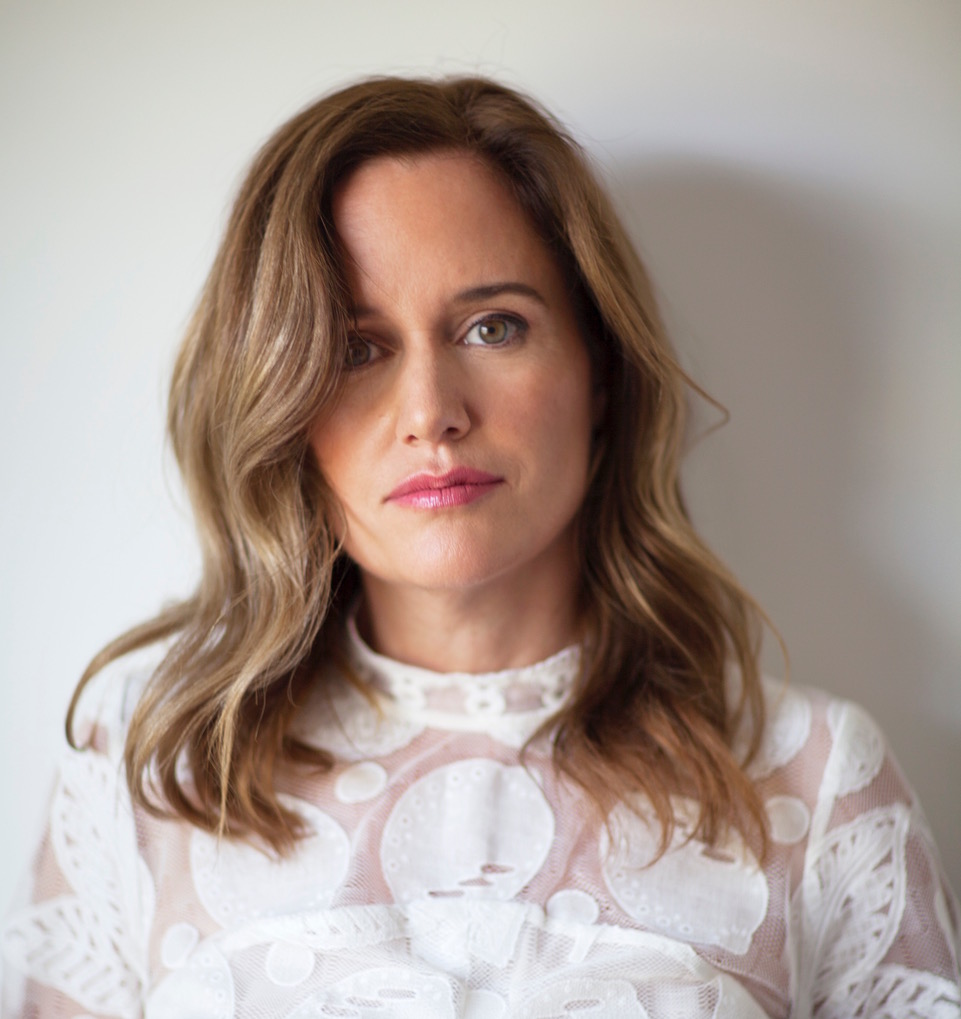
Havrilesky in 2016

Heather Havrilesky (born June 1970) is an American author, essayist, and humorist. She writes the advice column "Ask Polly". She is the author of Disaster Preparedness: A Memoir, the advice book How to Be a Person in the World and the essay collection What If This Were Enough?

== Career ==
In 1996, Havrilesky was hired as a staff writer at Suck.com, a webzine that was one of the web's earliest ad-supported content sites. Together with artist Terry Colon, she wrote the popular "Filler" comic strip for the site under the pen name Polly Esther.

In 2001, Havrilesky started an advice column on her personal blog called Dear Rabbit. In May of that year, she began writing an advice column on Suck, but the site went under a month later.

Havrilesky began writing for Salon in 2003 as their TV critic. In 2011, Havrilesky became one of the original columnists for The Daily, the world's first iPad-only news app. Havrilesky exited that position soon after the app launched, and the site was shuttered by its parent News Corporation in December 2012.

She pitched an advice column called Ask Polly to The Awl in 2012, which ran as a weekly feature. New York magazine began publishing the column in 2014. Each column addresses a single letter requesting advice.

Havrilesky's first book, Disaster Preparedness: A Memoir (2010), is an autobiographical work, it dealt mostly with her upbringing in Durham, North Carolina. Her second book, How to Be a Person in the World, was released in July 2016. The book was made up of new Ask Polly advice columns along with a handful of her most popular previously published columns. Her third book, the essay collection What If This Were Enough? was released in 2018. Erin Keane of Salon.com summarized the book as follows: "Havrilesky peels back the layers of late-capitalism malaise that bind us to the promise of some better version of ourselves lurking just beyond our reach, and dares us instead to accept our current, flawed lives, suffering and all, in order to settle into a less anxious and resentful present." In 2022 Havrilesky published a memoir, Foreverland: On the Divine Tedium of Marriage.

== Personal life ==
Havrilesky lives with her husband, Bill, in North Carolina. They have two daughters.

== Selected works ==
=== Books ===
- Disaster Preparedness: A Memoir (2010)
- How to Be a Person in the World (2016)
- How to Be a Person in the World: Ask Polly's Guide Through the Paradoxes of Modern (2017)
- Ask Polly's Guide to Your Next Crisis (A Vintage Short) (2017)
- What If This Were Enough? (2018)
- Foreverland: On the Divine Tedium of Marriage (2022)

=== Other writings ===
- Havrilesky, Heather (March 23, 2015). "Mother of Dragons". Shouts & Murmurs. The New Yorker. Vol. 91, no. 5. p. 49.
