= Tim Cavanaugh =

American journalist and screenwriter

Tim Cavanaugh is an American journalist and screenwriter based in Alexandria, Virginia. He is a news editor for The Washington Examiner. Prior to that, he was News Editor for National Review Online, Executive Editor for The Daily Caller, Managing Editor for Reason magazine, Web editor of the Los Angeles Times opinion page, and was the editor in chief of the website Suck.com from 1998 to 2001.

Cavanaugh was born and raised in Margate City, New Jersey and attended Atlantic City High School.

Cavanaugh is a winner of two Los Angeles Press Club awards and a Webby Award. His work has appeared in The Washington Post, The Boston Globe, Slate, The San Francisco Chronicle, The Beirut Daily Star, San Francisco Magazine, Mother Jones, Agence France-Presse, Wired, Newsday, Salon, Orange County Register, The Rake magazine, and other publications.

His satirical 2002 article mocking weblogs, "Let Slip the Blogs of War" (an update of an earlier article in Suck), infuriated many bloggers and was included in Perseus Publishing's anthology We've Got Blog. Nonetheless, Cavanaugh instituted Reason's popular weblog Hit & Run, which won a Weblog Award in 2005.

Cavanaugh wrote the screenplay for Home Run Showdown, a 2012 direct-to-video family baseball movie featuring Matthew Lillard, Dean Cain and Annabeth Gish.
