= The D-Word =

Online community for documentary filmmakers

The D-Word is an online community for professionals in the documentary film industry. Discussions include creative, business, technical, and social topics related to documentary filmmaking. The name "D-Word" is defined as "industry euphemism for documentary," as in: "We love your film but we don't know how to sell it. It's a d-word." As of 2019 it has over 17,000 members in 130 countries.

== History ==
The D-Word started in 1996 as a blog by documentary filmmaker Doug Block. Doug Block was taught how to create a blog by Justin Hall, the subject of Block's 1999 feature documentary, Home Page. Scenes of Hall showing Block how to create the D-word are shown in the film.

The site evolved from online journal to a virtual community for documentary filmmakers and fans in the fall of 1999. Early topics included Festivals, Events & Happenings, DV Production, Fundraising, Rights and Clearances, Marketing Through the Internet, Distribution and Shameless Self-Promotion. There were also more social topics called the “Bar & Grill” and the “Rant Room”. It started as a private space within Howard Rheingold's Brainstorms community.

Block continues to be a co-host of The D-Word, together with documentary makers Ben Kempas (between 2001–2014); John Burgan (between 2005–2018); Marjan Safinia (from 2009); Erica Ginsberg (from 2011); Niam Itani (from 2013); Heidi Fleisher, Peter Gerard, and Paul Szynol (between 2016–2018). The D-word has no paid staff and is run by volunteers.

Members of The D-Word engaged in two collaborative projects, composed of short films themed around Essays on Docs, a reflection on filmmaking, as well as War and Peace, the community's reaction to the September 11, 2001 attacks. A novelty at the time, these films were streamed online and presented at industry events like the International Documentary Filmfestival Amsterdam.

== Membership ==
Membership in The D-Word is free.

There are two types of membership, “fan” and “professional”. “Fan” memberships are automatic and open to the public, and are available to documentary enthusiasts without professional experience. Filmmakers can apply for membership as a “professional”. Those using the site as a professional are able to access more topics and engage in conversations with other professional members. Posts by professionals are not accessible on the broader web and won’t be shown in search engine results. Some notable members include Academy Awards nominee James Longley (Iraq in Fragments), Laura Poitras (“Citizenfour”), and industry figures Thom Powers (Toronto Film Festival) and Deirdre Haj (Full Frame Documentary Film Festival).

== Public discussions ==
In addition to the private community, The D-Word hosts week-long public discussions, moderated by the hosts, featuring guest experts from the documentary world. Past guests include Anand Patwardhan, Albert Maysles, Sandi Simcha DuBowski, Ross McElwee, Jennifer Fox and Katherine Nolfi.

The D-Word's public discussions have explored topics such as "Reaching a Wider Audience" with Lance Weiler; a conference on the use of social networks by filmmakers; a panel on new online distribution platforms for documentaries, and reactions by broadcasters to the broadband developments. Other conferences have focused on ethical issues in documentary practice (with Patricia Aufderheide of the Center for Media and Social Impact).

== Partnerships ==
The D-Word works closely with documentary organizations such as the European Documentary Network. It partners with Docs in Progress on Peer Pitch, a program held in various U.S. locations for documentary filmmakers with works-in-progress at any stage of development to get feedback.

In the past, public discussions were supported by the Independent Feature Project in New York. Members regularly attend meetings at industry events such as the Sheffield International Documentary Festival, the International Documentary Film Festival Amsterdam (IDFA), and AFI Docs.
