= United Software Association =

Former warez organization

The United Software Association (USA) was a warez organization which released games and software for the IBM PC platform during the 1990s. USA formed a co-op with the PC warez division of Fairlight which was best known as "USA/FLT". USA was formed as the result of a split of several members from another noteworthy PC group, The Humble Guys (THG). Key members, such as Genesis and The NotSoHumble Babe, left THG, eventually resulting in public displays of animosity.

USA had a subdivision known as "USA-DoX" which was responsible for transcribing or otherwise typing up documentation to accompany a release. This division was also carried over by Genesis from THG, which previously had its own documentation division known as "HumbleDox".

== In the news ==
In late January 1992, several members of USA, including Mike Arnolds (The Grim Reaper) and "Amy" (The NotSoHumble Babe), were arrested by the United States Secret Service (in cooperation with the Farmington Hills Police and Michigan State Police) for carding (credit card fraud).
