= Disinformation (TV series) =

- Also known as: Disinfo Nation
- Genre: Documentary series
- Written by: Richard Metzger; Bradley Novicoff
- Directed by: Richard Metzger; Craig Melville
- Presented by: Richard Metzger
- Country of origin: United Kingdom
- Original language: English
- No. of seasons: 2
- No. of episodes: 16

Production
- Producer: Gary Baddeley
- Running time: 30 minutes

Original release
- Network: Channel 4
- Release: 14 January 2000 – 16 February 2001

Disinformation, also known as Disinfo Nation and DisinfoTV, is a television show hosted by Richard Metzger. It was aired for two seasons on Channel 4 in the UK as part of their late night "4Later" programming block. Called a "punk rock 60 Minutes" and "wilder than Jackass" by the Los Angeles Times and Wired respectively, the sixteen 30-minute episodes produced for C4 (and several segments never aired in the UK) were then cut down to four one-hour "specials" intended for the Sci Fi Channel in America, but never aired due to the controversial nature of what was portrayed on screen. According to interviews Metzger was told just twelve days prior to the first specials' air-date that he would have to cut 50% of the material from the show in order to pass the USA Network's corporate lawyers' scrutiny. Those four shows have subsequently been released on a DVD with a second bonus disc presenting highlights of The DisinfoCon, a twelve-hour event featuring shock rocker Marilyn Manson, underground filmmaker Kenneth Anger, painter Joe Coleman, and others such as Douglas Rushkoff, Mark Pesce, Grant Morrison, Brother Theodore, and Robert Anton Wilson.
