= 51 Birch Street =

- Directed by: Doug Block
- Written by: Doug Block; Amy Seplin
- Produced by: Doug Block; Lori Cheatle
- Starring: Mike Block; Mina Block; Carol Block; Doug Block
- Music by: Machine Head; H. Scott Salinas
- Distributed by: Truly Indie
- Release dates: September 14, 2005 (Toronto International Film Festival); October 22, 2006 (U.S.)
- Running time: 88 minutes
- Country: United States
- Language: English

51 Birch Street is a 2005 documentary film about the universal themes of love, marriage, fidelity, and the mystery of a suburban family. It was directed by Doug Block.

== Synopsis ==
51 Birch Street is the first-person account of a family's life-changing events. A few months after his mother's sudden death from pneumonia, Doug Block's 83-year-old father, Mike, calls him to announce that he's moving to Florida to live with "Kitty", his secretary from 40 years before. Always close to his mother and equally distant from his father, Doug and his two older sisters were shocked and suspicious.

When Mike and Kitty marry and sell the Block family home, Doug returns to suburban Long Island for one last visit. Among the mementos being packed away, Doug discovers three large boxes filled with his mother's daily diaries going back 35 years in which she recorded her unhappiness, her rage against her husband, her sexual fantasies about her therapist, a brief affair with an unnamed friend of her husband—and her suspicions about Kitty. The marriage, Mike told Doug on film, "was not loving, it was a functioning association". With only a few weeks before the movers come and his father leaves, Doug is determined to explore his parents' marriage.

Through conversations with family members and friends and surprising diary revelations, Doug finally comes to peace with his parents who are more complex and troubled than he ever imagined. The documentary explores more subtle forms of repression, secrecy and denial within a family, and confirms the complexity of marriage.

== Response ==
The New York Times film critic A.O. Scott said the film was "one of the most moving and fascinating documentaries I’ve seen this year", and listed it as one of his ten favorite films of the year. Jim Emerson of RogerEbert.com named 51 Birch Street one of the top ten films of 2006. By December 10, 2006, the film had grossed $84,689.

On review aggregator website Rotten Tomatoes, the film holds an approval rating of 97% based on 36 reviews, with an average rating of 8.0/10. The website's consensus reads: "A filmmaker's investigation of his parents' marriage renders an ordinary subject surprisingly powerful."
