= Suck.com =

Online magazine

Suck
- Website type: Politics & Popular culture
- Available in: English
- Owner: Automatic Media (from 2000)
- Creators: Joey Anuff, Heather Havrilesky, Terry Colon
- Founders: Joey Anuff and Carl Steadman
- Editors: Carl Steadman (1995–1998), Tim Cavanaugh (1998–2001)
- Key people: Terry Colon
- Website: suck.com
- Commercial: Yes
- Launched: 1995; 31 years ago
- Current status: Defunct (as of June 8, 2001)

Suck.com was an online magazine, one of the earliest ad-supported content sites on the Internet. It featured daily editorial content on a great variety of topics, including politics and pop-culture. Launched in 1995 and geared towards a Generation X audience, the website's motto was "A fish, a barrel, and a smoking gun". Despite not publishing new content since 2001, the site remained online until December 2018.

== History ==
Suck was initiated in 1995 by writer Joey Anuff and editor Carl Steadman, two former employees of HotWired, the first commercial online magazine. The name of the website, Suck.com, was chosen as a domain name with possibly offensive connotations — though apparently not enough to be disallowed by Network Solutions, which controlled the InterNIC system for the distribution of domain names before ICANN acquired that authority. The name also described the nature of "news aggregator" sites that "sucked" stories from the internet and published them in magazine-like formats.

During 1996, Suck hired writer Heather Havrilesky, who wrote the column Filler under the pseudonym Polly Esther.

In 1997, Suck published a compilation of the site's most popular essays in Suck: Worst-Case Scenarios in Media, Culture, Advertising and the Internet (ISBN 1-888869-27-5).

In the years 2000 to 2001, cartoonist Peter Bagge did a number of comics journalism stories for Suck on such topics as politics, the Miss America Pageant, bar culture, and the Oscars.

=== Closure ===
In July 2000, after a decrease in Internet investment, Suck.com merged with Feed Magazine to create Automatic Media. The concept was to streamline operations and collaborate on boutique operations with low staffing costs. The joint project, Plastic.com, was founded with only four staffed employees.

Despite the site's faithful following and a combined reader base of more than one million, Automatic Media ended in June 2001. On June 8, 2001, Suck.com declared that they were "Gone Fishin'" indefinitely, and the site ceased to publish new content. Regarding the indefinite hiatus, co-founder Joey Anuff said, "It was a shame. On the other hand... it's shocking how long Suck lasted."

=== Archive email newsletter ===
During the autumn of 2015, software developer Mark MacDonald began serializing the website's archive in an email newsletter, which is sent on a daily basis 20 years to the day after its original publication on Suck.com.

== Style ==
From the beginning, site founders Anuff and Steadman created daily comically cynical commentary with a self-obsessed and satiric theme. The writing was accentuated by the art of cartoonist Terry Colon. In addition to Colon's distinctive artwork, the website had many features common to its articles. The main text of each article was restricted to a table only 200 pixels wide. Most articles featured links within the flow of the content rather than as in labeled footnotes or references, which was less common than it would become a few years later.

== Recognition ==
Suck.com was nominated for Webby Awards in both 1997 (Books and Magazines category) and 1999 (Humor category).

== Regular columns ==
- Hit & Run — a link-driven summary of recent events. (Note: In 2002, after Suck.com's demise, editors Nick Gillespie and Tim Cavanaugh brought Hit & Run to Reason magazine website as the group blog. Gillespie and Cavanaugh brought along several other Suck.com writers to contribute, and fostered a style in the blog matching Suck's sarcastic attitude. Reason editors referred to this co-opting of the former website as the "Suck-ification of Reason". In 2005, Hit & Run was named one of the best political blogs by Playboy.)
- Filler — a weekly self-deprecating satire of cultural pretension and dating in postmodern times.

== Staff and contributors ==
Staff

- Carl Steadman, co-founder, writer, and editor, became the owner of Plastic.com.
- Joey Anuff, co-founder, writer, and editor.
- Tim Cavanaugh, editor in chief from 1998 to 2001, became web editor of the Los Angeles Times opinion page, and then a contributor to Reason magazine.
- Ana Marie Cox, executive editor (who wrote as "Ann O'Tate"), was later the writer of the popular blog Wonkette and wrote for Time.com
- Heather Havrilesky
- Owen Thomas, copy editor and managing editor at Valleywag.

Contributors

- Peter Bagge
- Steve Bodow
- Rogers Cadenhead
- Mark Dery
- Michael Gerber
- Nick Gillespie
- Greg Knauss
- Josh Ozersky
- Tom Spurgeon
- Jake Tapper

== See also ==
- Memepool
