= American Jobs =

- Directed by: Greg Spotts
- Written by: Greg Spotts
- Produced by: Greg Spotts
- Cinematography: Edwin Schiernecker; Greg Spotts
- Edited by: Greg Spotts
- Music by: Tom Rothrock
- Release date: 2004
- Country: United States
- Language: English

American Jobs is a 2004 independent film, documentary, written, produced and directed by Greg Spotts. The film is about the loss of American jobs to low-wage foreign competition, covering the phenomenon of outsourcing in manufacturing and high-paying white-collar jobs. The filmmaker visited 19 cities and towns throughout the United States interviewing recently laid-off workers, focusing on three industries: textiles, commercial aircraft and information technology. It also contains interviews with a number of members of Congress, including: Sherrod Brown (D-Ohio), Rosa DeLauro (D-Connecticut), Robin Hayes (R-North Carolina), Donald Manzullo (R-Illinois), and Hilda Solis (D-California), and includes an extended section of clips from the 1993 congressional debate on NAFTA. (North American Free Trade Agreement).

Spotts self-released the film on DVD via a website on Labor Day, 2004. The CNN program Lou Dobbs Tonight featured excerpts from American Jobs on seven consecutive weeknights in September 2004, exposure which attracted a distribution deal. The Disinformation Company, publisher of Robert Greenwald's series of documentary DVDs, released American Jobs on DVD in February 2005, along with a companion book penned by Spotts, CAFTA and Free Trade: What Every American Should Know. The book was used as a lobbying tool by the AFL-CIO and members of the US Congress during the summer of 2005 when Congress was debating ratification of the Central American Free Trade Agreement.

Spotts subsequently wrote the official companion book to Robert Greenwald's 2005 documentary Wal-Mart: The High Cost of Low Price.
