= Justin Hall =

American journalist and entrepreneur (born 1974)

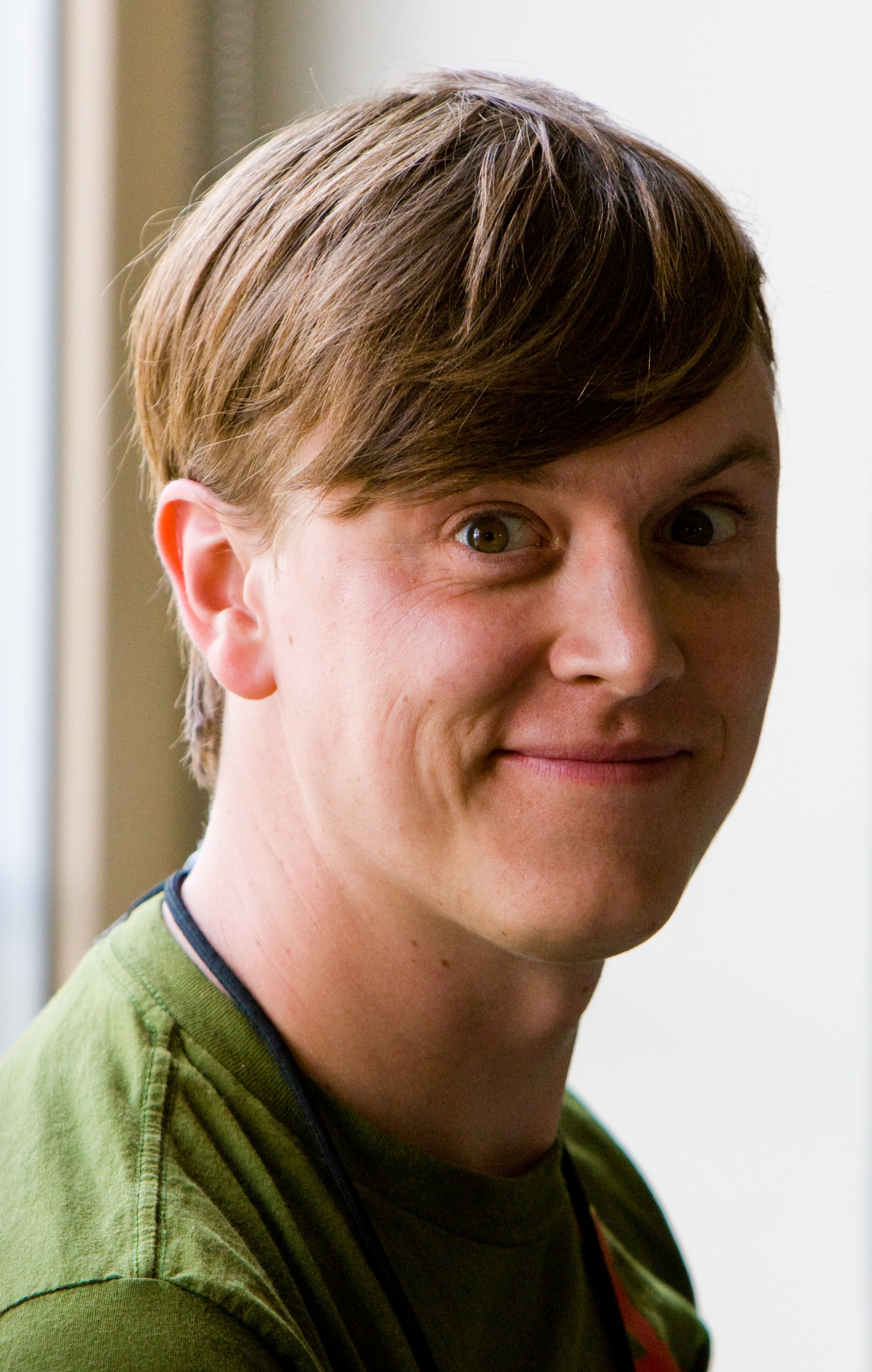
- Justin Hall in 2008
- Born: December 16, 1974 (age 51); Chicago, Illinois
- Education: Francis W. Parker; Swarthmore College; University of Southern California
- Occupations: Recruiter, Director of Culture & Communications
- Known for: Blogging, The Nethernet
- Website: Links.net

Justin Hall (born December 16, 1974) is an American journalist and entrepreneur, best known as a pioneer blogger.

== Biography ==
Born in Chicago, Illinois, Hall graduated Francis W. Parker High School in 1993. In 1994, while a student at Swarthmore College, Justin started his web-based diary Justin's Links from the Underground, which offered one of the earliest guided tours of the web. Over time, the site came to focus on Hall's life in intimate detail. In December 2004, The New York Times Magazine referred to him as "the founding father of personal blogging."

In 1994, during a break from college Hall joined HotWired, the first commercial web magazine started within Wired magazine. There, he began a long-term working partnership with critic, writer and teacher Howard Rheingold. Later Hall would become a freelance journalist covering video games, mobile technology and internet culture. He published analysis from game conferences such as E3 as well as the Tokyo Game Show. He chronicled the first Indie Game Jam in 2002. From late 2001 and 2003, Hall was based in Japan, mostly Tokyo and Akita, authoring a guidebook Just In Tokyo.

In 2007, Hall graduated from the MFA program in the USC Interactive Media Division. His thesis project was an attempt to make surfing the web into a multiplayer game: PMOG, the Passively Multiplayer Online Game. Hall went on to serve as CEO of GameLayers, which raised $2 million to turn PMOG into The Nethernet, a MMO in a Firefox toolbar. The Nethernet failed to turn a profit, and GameLayers closed down as a company. The server and client software for the Nethernet was released as open source and Hall went on to publish A Story of GameLayers, "open-sourcing our business process".

At present, Hall lives in San Francisco, California. He served as a Producer on ngmoco:)'s Touch Pets series, and then became ngmoco:)'s Director of Culture & Communications. After working for ngmoco:)'s parent company DeNA as a Recruiter, Hall left the company in mid-2013. In 2015 he released a self-produced short documentary Overshare: the Links.net Story exploring his "extremely personal blogging". In September 2017, Hall began work as co-founder & Chief Technology Officer for bud.com, a California benefit corporation delivering recreational cannabis, built on a domain name he registered in 1994.

== Selected works ==
- Playing a Life Online - an audio recording March 11, 2006 (speech at South by Southwest in Austin, Texas USA)
- "The Fantasy Life of Coder Boys". Wired. April 2003. Archived from the original on April 17, 2003.
- "Where the Geeks Are", August 19, 1999, Rolling Stone
- "Today's Visions of the Science of Tomorrow", January 4, 2003, New York Times op-ed
- "Hire This Boy To Play Your Video Games", October 12, 2000, Rolling Stone
- Just In Tokyo, 2002, Garrett County Press. ISBN 978-1-891053-50-4

=== Contributor ===
- J. Goldstein & J. Raessens, Handbook of Computer Game Studies, MIT Press, 2005: Chapter on "Future of Games: Mobile Gaming"
- T. Fullerton & C. Swain, Game Design Workshop, CMP Books, 2004: Sidebar/chapter on "The Indie Game Jam."
- V. Burnham, Supercade: A Visual History of the Videogame Age, MIT Press, 2001: Essays on the Apple ][, Burger Time and Spy Hunter.

=== Films ===
- Hall was featured in the documentary Home Page.
- He appeared nude as an actor in Blood.
- Hall appears in the science fiction film Radio Free Steve.
- Hall appeared in Famke Janssen's critically panned 2011 film Bringing Up Bobby.
