= The iSONEWS =

- Website type: Internet forum, a former Database
- Available in: English
- Creator: orm
- Website: www.theisonews.com
- Commercial: No
- Registration: Required for posting
- Launched: December 7, 1998; 27 years ago

The iSONEWS was a warez news website originally created by orm who later deferred management of the website to krazy8 and mandarin. TheiSONews supplied release details and NFOs of warez games and programs, without actually supplying them, or supplying any information on where to find them. Later it was also called a fan site that has become an unofficial hub of DivX news.

== Domain seizure ==
On February 28, 2003, the United States Department of Justice seized the isonews domain name (isonews.com), however its servers remained intact. A number of iSONEWS mirrors sprung up as a result, including izonews.com, theisonews.com, and stolemy.com, an expression of retaliation from the iSONEWS community caused by the Department of Justice's actions. The closure of the isonews.com domain brought more attention to the site, and after the site was back up on mirror sites, the membership and the user activity on the forums increased.

Approximately one year following the seizure, visitors to iSONEWS.com were redirected to the United States Department of Justice cybercrime.gov website. As of November 16, 2004, the original domain, isonews.com, is owned by DomainSpa LLC and used to advertise video game sales and rentals.

David "krazy8" Rocci got a sentence of 5 months in federal prison and a $28,500 fine for selling modchips on isonews.com. Krazy8 later indicated that modchips was the 'official' modus operandi, but every question I was ever asked related to ISONews and had nothing to do with modchips.

== Current status ==
From being a release site for the warez community, the site has evolved into a broader message board, concentrating mostly on PC gaming. The PC games forum on the site contains everything from rumors, latest news, hints, tips and tweaks to various games. As of June 2007, the releases are never updated, however the forums are still (barely) in use.

== See also ==
- .nfo
- Standard (warez)
