= Doug Block =

American documentary filmmaker

- Born: Port Washington, New York, U.S.
- Education: Cornell University
- Occupations: Director, Cinematographer, Writer and Producer
- Years active: 1991–present
- Parents: Mike Block (father); Mina Block (mother)

Doug Block (born 1953 in Port Washington, New York) is an American documentary filmmaker. He is best known for his documentaries 112 Weddings, 51 Birch Street, Home Page, and The Kids Grow Up. He is also founder of the online community for documentary filmmakers, The D-word, which has been active since 1999.

== Life and career ==
Block was born in Port Washington, New York and graduated from Cornell University.

Block's debut documentary film The Heck With Hollywood!, about the challenges of three first-time filmmakers, screened at over two dozen film festivals, in 1991.

In August 1999 he founded (and is currently a co-host of) The D-Word, an online community for documentary professionals worldwide. In 2015, Block told IndieWire that his aim was to create an inclusive and supportive online discussion forum and community for documentary professionals throughout the world.

His second documentary film, Home Page, was nominated for the Grand Jury Prize at the Sundance Film Festival. In 2005, his documentary, 51 Birch Street, a personal story about his parents' relationship, was named one of the 10 Best Films of the Year by The New York Times. In 2010, his documentary, The Kids Grow Up, about watching his daughter Lucy grow up through his camera lens, received Special Jury Mention at the Silverdocs festival.

In 2014, he spoke to IndieWire about why he opted to premiere 112 Weddings, his documentary about the couples he filmed as a wedding videographer, on HBO rather than having traditional theatrical distribution. For him, festivals were the "theatrical run."

Block has said that he sees 112 Weddings, 51 Birch Street and The Kids Grow Up as an unofficial trilogy about family dynamics.

Since 2019, Block has been working on a new documentary, Betty & Henri, which is based on a love letter tucked into the guidebook he'd taken along on a wedding anniversary trip to Paris.

== Filmography ==
- 112 Weddings (2014) (Director, Producer, Cameraman)
- The Children Next Door (2013) (Director, Cameraman)
- Resurrect Dead: The Mystery of the Toynbee Tiles (2011) (Executive Producer)
- The Kids Grow Up (2010) (Director, Producer, Cameraman)
- The Edge of Dreaming (2009) (Producer)
- Orgasm Inc. (2009) (Consulting Producer)
- A Walk Into the Sea: Danny Williams and the Warhol Factory (2007) (Producer)
- 51 Birch Street (2005) (Director, Producer, Cameraman)
- Paternal Instinct (2004) (co-producer)
- Love and Diane (2002) (Consulting Producer, Cameraman)
- Home Page (1998) (Director, Producer, Cameraman)
- A Perfect Candidate (1996) (Cameraman)
- Jupiter's Wife by Michel Negroponte (1995) (co-producer)
- Silverlake Life: The View from Here (1993) (co-producer)
- The Heck With Hollywood! (1991) (Director, Producer, Cameraman)
