= Robert Vas =

Robert Vas (Vas Róbert; 3 March 1931, Budapest – 10 April 1978) was a Hungarian film director who settled in England.

He came to England after the Hungarian uprising in 1956. He was committed to documentary, like Refuge England (1959) and, after a short period working for the National Coal Board, he went on to make a seminal series of films for the BBC. These include The Golden Years of Alexander Korda (1968) and Heart of Britain (1970), The Issue Should be Avoided (1971), My Homeland (1976), a three-hour examination of the life of Joseph Stalin (1973), and Nine Days in '26 (1974). He had planned to make films about the Gulag Archipelago and the wartime bombing of Dresden before his untimely death on 10 April 1978.

In the BBC documentary tribute to Vas directed by Barrie Gavin, Karel Reisz said of him that his aim was to "inspire thought, to remind and warn".

== Bibliography ==
- Burgan, John “Robert Vas”, Encyclopedia of the Documentary Film, ed. Ian Aitken, Routledge, New York, 2006, pp. 958–959
- Davies, Brenda, 'Obituary', BFI News, n. 34, July 1978, p. 3.
- Barrie Gavin and Alan Rosenthal, 'Witness: In Memoriam, Robert Vas', Sight and Sound, Summer 1978 pp. 186–189
- "Robert Vas Film-Maker" on YouTube (BBC, broadcast 3/5/1978, Barrie Gavin)
- Screenonline: Vas, Robert (1931-1978) BFI online guide to Britain's film & TV history
