= Webmonkey =

Webmonkey was an online tutorial website composed of various articles on building webpages from backend to frontend. The site covered many aspects of developing on the web like programming, database, multimedia, and setting up web storefronts. The content presented was much like Wired magazine but for learning to design web content. Webmonkey had content applicable to both advanced users and newer internet users interested in the underlying technologies of the web.

== History ==
Webmonkey was launched in August 1996 by the owners of Wired magazine. Many Wired readers were interested in building a similar Java-powered website, making Webmonkey instantly popular among the tech crowd, including Dave Thau's javascript tutorial.

In 1999, Webmonkey introduced Webmonkey Kids, a web design tutorial site for children.

During the dot-com crash, Webmonkey's ad revenue dramatically shrank. 7 persons of its 10-employee staff were laid off.

Webmonkey was shut down in February 2004. It was reopened in February 2006, and mothballed again later in 2006.

In May 2008, Webmonkey was acquired by Condé Nast Publications, the company that publishes Wired magazine. It was temporarily relaunched as a wiki, but reconverted due to spam issues. Instead, the Webmonkey website was regularly updated with new articles by Scott Gilbertson until May 2013, when it was decided to stop producing content for it. The webmonkey URL was redirected to wired.com.
