= Lily Burana =

American writer

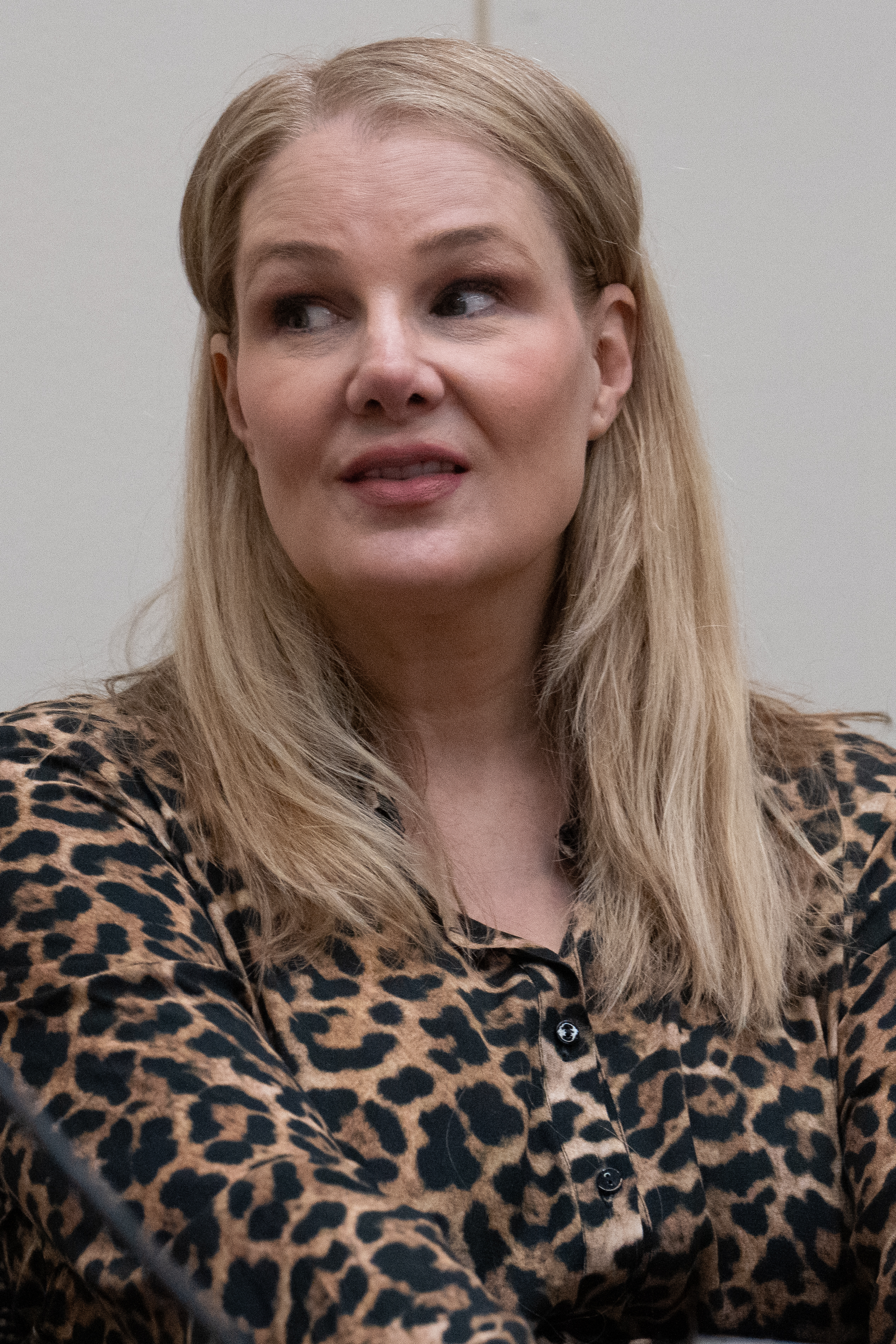
- Burana at AWP 2026
- Occupation: Writer
- Writing career
- Subjects: Culture, feminism

Lily Burana is an American writer whose books include Grace for Amateurs: Field Notes on a Journey Back to Faith (Thomas Nelson, 2017), I Love a Man in Uniform: A Memoir of Love, War, and Other Battles (Weinstein Books, 2009), the novel Try (St. Martin's Press, 2006) and Strip City: A Stripper's Farewell Journey Across America (Miramax Books, 2001).

I Love a Man in Uniform won the Elle magazine Reader's Prize in May 2009. A New York Times review of the book by J. Courtney Sullivan lauded it as "a notable historical document."

Strip City was named one of the Best Books of the Year by Entertainment Weekly, Salon, New York Newsday, and The Rocky Mountain News. In 2008, Entertainment Weekly published a feature called "So You Want to Write a Memoir," which indexed a thousand recent memoirs by subject. Strip City was among ten memoirs cited for their singular quality: "Whatever you might expect from a cross-country stripping odyssey, this surely isn't it. For one thing, Burana's eloquent, thoughtful goodbye to her longtime craft of bump-and-grind is decidedly unsexy. For another, her experiences frame a sort of social history of strip clubs and the girls who work at them."

As a journalist, Burana frequently writes about media, pop culture, religion, feminism, and LGBTQ issues, with a recent emphasis on the cultural and domestic dimensions of military affairs. She has written for over 50 publications, including The Atlantic, The Washington Post, GQ, The New York Times, The Los Angeles Times, Self, Glamour, Entertainment Weekly, Details, the Village Voice, and the New York Observer. She was a contributing editor at New York Magazine and SPIN. As a public speaker, she has appeared at The United States Military Academy, Columbia University, San Francisco State University, and the San Francisco Art Institute.

Her recent book, Grace for Amateurs: Field Notes on a Journey Back to Faith (Thomas Nelson, 2017), was released on October 31, 2017.

== Personal ==
Lily Burana started writing for punk 'zines while still a teenager. Her first book, Strip City: A Stripper's Farewell Journey Across America was a chronicle of her work as a stripper during her late teens and early twenties. Burana married an Army officer in 2002. In 2008, she began "Operation Bombshell," a burlesque class for wives of deployed soldiers.

She lives in New York, and had her first child in 2014, who was baptised a Catholic.
