= Feed Magazine =

Online magazine

- Website type: News
- Website: Official website at the Wayback Machine (archived 2001-05-31)
- Commercial: Yes
- Launched: May 1995; 31 years ago
- Current status: Closed as of June 2001

Feed or feedmag.com (1995–2001) was one of the earliest online magazines that relied entirely on its original content.

== History ==
Feed was founded in New York by Stefanie Syman and Steven Johnson in May 1995, with novelist Sam Lipsyte serving as one of its editors.

One of the web's earliest general-interest daily publications, Feed focused on media, pop culture, technology, science and the arts.

Feed soon found a devoted following among an alternative readership and was critically acclaimed, but as a small independent publication, it struggled to raise sufficient advertising revenue.

In July 2000, following a sharp downturn in Internet investment, Feed merged with the popular editorial site Suck.com to create Automatic Media. The two sites sought to streamline their operations and collaborate with low staffing costs. Their joint project Plastic.com was founded with only four staffed employees. Despite the faithful cult following and a combined reader base of over 1 million, Automatic Media folded in June 2001, and Feed closed operations.
