= HotWired =

First commercial online magazine

- HotWired website in 1999
- Website type: Technology news
- Website: www.hotwired.com
- Commercial: Yes
- Launched: October 27, 1994; 32 years ago
- Current status: Closed

Hotwired (1994–1999) was the first commercial online magazine, launched on October 27, 1994. Although it was part of the print magazine Wired, Hotwired carried original content.

== History ==
Andrew Anker, Wired's then Vice President and CTO, wrote the original HotWired business plan. On its approval in April 1994, he became HotWired's first CEO, and oversaw the development of the website. Over the next five years several other sites grew out of Hotwired, most notably Wired News, Webmonkey, and the Wired search engine HotBot.

After several previous site iterations, HotWired 4.0 launched on July 1, 1997, marking the magazine's most comprehensive overhaul. The reinvention efforts were led by Executive Producer June Cohen, Executive Editor Cate Corcoran and Senior Designer Sabine Messner. The redesigned site featured Dynamic HTML homepage teasers, more focus on user-centric interaction and a simplified channel structure.

The site launched before the advent of Time Inc.'s Pathfinder.com site, and the emergence of independent web magazines such as Feed, Word, and Salon. HotWired's initial business model was 'corporate sponsorship', which quickly led to the design of the 'ad banner' display areas still in use today. The first banner ad on the internet was an AT&T ad featured on the site in 1994. The first direct marketing focused ads were sold by David Hyman to Virtual Vineyards. Under the leadership of Rex Briggs, HotWired was the first to measure the effectiveness of online advertising, and among the first to attempt behavioral targeting and the first to apply real-time web analytics, known as “HotStats.”

Wired Ventures' online division was acquired by Lycos, Inc. in October 1998, a year after Condé Nast acquired Wired Magazine. It launched "HotWired 5.0" in September as an aggregator of Wired News and an archive of old HotWired content, slashing fresh editorial content except for Suck and Webmonkey. In 2006, Lycos turned the domain into a pay-per-click advertising hub, seemingly marking the definitive end of Hotwired as an online magazine. However, in July 2006, Condé Nast acquired both Webmonkey and the Hotwired domain from Lycos, and Webmonkey was relaunched in May 2008.

== Projects and sites ==
Projects and sites published under the Hotwired banner from 1994 to 1999 include:

- Adrenaline (1994–1996)-Daily Magazine of Alternative Sports developed and edited by Caitlin Pulleyblank. Magazine linked to an Interactive database of play spots on a graphical interface [realtime surf data, climbing data located (latitude/longitude), ultimate teams, mountain bike trails, rafting locations with posted CFS data].
- Animation Express (1998–2002) - Curated collection of animated short films presented in Flash, Shockwave, and QuickTime formats.
- Ask Dr. Weil (1996-1997) - Steven Petrow was the founding editor of Dr. Andrew Weil's integrative medicine site.
- Beta Lounge (1997–1999) - Live DJ channel
- Brain Tennis (1996–1997) - Debate as a spectator's sport
- Cocktail (1996–1997) - Recipes for, history of, and variations on cocktails
- DaveNet (1995–1996) - Dave Winer's developer musings
- Dream Jobs (1995–1998) - Inspiring people & company profiles
- Geek of the Week (1997–1998) - Weekly featured member page of HotWired members around the world
- HotBot (1996–Present) - Search Engine (partnered with Inktomi)
- Intelligent Agent (1995) - Travel through the minds of Rudy Rucker, Randy Shilts, Joshua Quittner, and others.
- Member Pages (1997–1998) - Template-based do-it-yourself homepage profiles of users
- Muckraker (1995–1996) - Brock N. Meeks follows the Net from Washington, DC.
- Netizen (1996–1997) - The first website to cover a presidential election, featuring daily writing from John Heilemann and Jon Katz, edited by David Weir. Where politics, digital culture, and the high-tech industry intersect;
- Net Soup (1995–1996) - Listservs and newsgroup postings.
- Net Surf (1997) - Events of the Net industry.
- Net Surf Central (1995–1996) - An interactive database of the cool Web sites of 1996
- Packet (1997–1998) - Intelligence from the technological frontier, featuring Michael Schrage, Brooke Shelby Biggs, Simson Garfinkel, Steve Silberman, and Mark Frauenfelder)
- Piazza (1994–1995) - the first communication forum within HotWired, including "Threads" (conferencing system) and "Club Wired" - (a live, Telnet-based chat system customized by Laura La Gassa - hosted by Will Kreth and Susanna Camp)
- Pop (1995–1996) - Michael Small oversaw arts coverage (articles, reviews, interviews, streaming audio, chats) featuring editors/writers John Alderman, Rob Levine, Ian Christe, and Sarah Borruso.
- Renaissance 2.0 (1994–1995) - HotWired's original art and literary channel, managed by Gary Wolf with illustrations by Sabine Messner
- RGB Gallery - Electronic art collection
- Signal (1994–1996) - What did e-commerce, e-politics, and e-culture look like in 1995?
- Suck (1995–2001) - Web and media commentary redefining the word 'sarcastic'
- Synapse (1997–1998) - Colorful, interactive viewpoints on technology and culture, featuring Jon Katz
- Talk.com (1996–1998) - Live chats and interviews
- Test Patterns (1996) - What HotWired employees did in their spare time
- The Rough Guide (1995—1998) - Online travel library in partnership with Rough Guides
- Web 101 (1997–1999) - Your smart introduction to the Net.
- Webmonkey (1996–2002) - Web programming tips and techniques
- World Beat (1994–1995) - Travel

== See also ==
- Wired News
