= Kim Wilde discography =

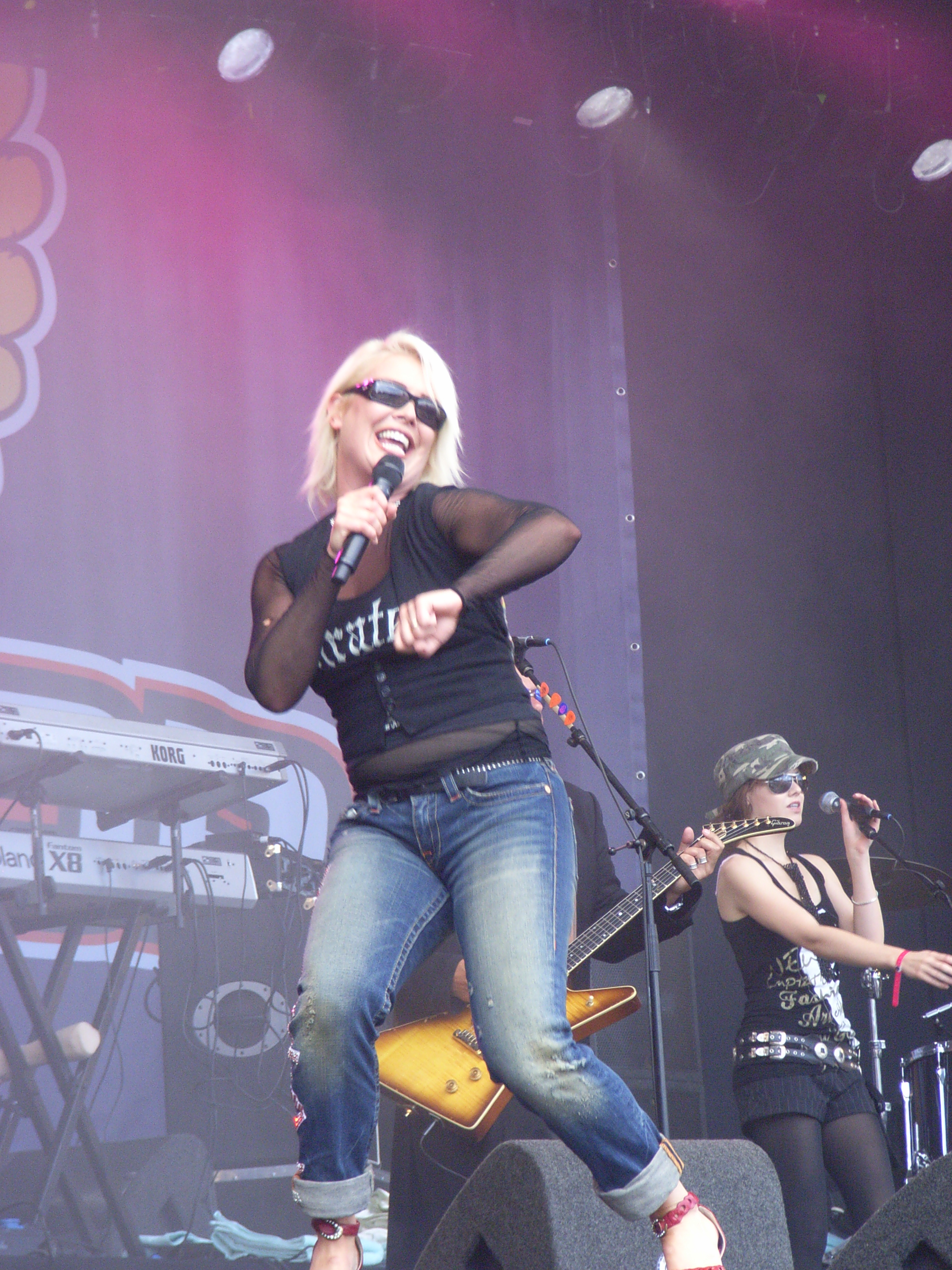
- Wilde performing in July 2007
- Studio albums: 15
- Live albums: 1
- Compilation albums: 5
- Singles: 66
- Video albums: 6
- Music videos: 60
- Remix albums: 1

English singer Kim Wilde has released 15 studio albums, one live album, five compilation albums, one remix album, 66 singles (including five as a featured artist), six video albums and 60 music videos.

== Albums ==
=== Studio albums ===
List of studio albums, with selected chart positions and certifications
Title	Details	Peak chart positions										Certifications
Title	Details	UK	AUS	AUT	FIN	GER	NLD	NOR	SWE	SWI	US	Certifications
Kim Wilde	Released: 29 June 1981; Label: RAK; Formats: CD, LP, cassette	3	25	—	3	1	5	—	1	—	86	BPI: Gold; BVMI: Gold; IFPI FIN: Gold
Select	Released: 10 May 1982; Label: RAK; Formats: CD, LP, cassette	19	8	20	1	4	1	12	2	—	—	BPI: Silver; IFPI FIN: Gold
Catch as Catch Can	Released: 7 November 1983; Label: RAK; Formats: CD, LP, cassette	90	97	—	1	23	35	—	17	6	—	IFPI FIN: Gold
Teases & Dares	Released: 5 November 1984; Label: MCA; Formats: CD, LP, cassette	66	—	—	24	22	—	—	35	10	84	
Another Step	Released: 3 November 1986; Label: MCA; Formats: CD, LP, cassette	73	31	—	—	41	70	2	49	5	40	
Close	Released: 1 June 1988; Label: MCA; Formats: CD, LP, cassette	8	82	7	11	10	8	6	11	8	114	BPI: Platinum; BVMI: Gold; GLF: Gold; IFPI SWI: Platinum; NVPI: Gold
Love Moves	Released: 1 May 1990; Label: MCA; Formats: CD, LP, cassette	37	126	—	18	24	39	10	10	12	—	IFPI SWI: Gold
Love Is	Released: 18 May 1992; Label: MCA; Formats: CD, LP, cassette	21	92	22	—	42	53	—	25	7	—	GLF: Gold; IFPI SWI: Gold
Now & Forever	Released: 30 October 1995; Label: MCA; Formats: CD, cassette	—	—	—	—	—	—	—	—	37	—	
Never Say Never	Released: 8 September 2006; Label: EMI; Formats: CD, digital download	—	—	22	30	17	32	—	—	11	—	
Come Out and Play	Released: 27 August 2010; Label: Columbia SevenOne; Formats: CD, digital download	—	—	24	—	10	—	—	—	9	—	
Snapshots	Released: 26 August 2011; Label: Columbia SevenOne; Formats: CD, digital download	—	—	—	—	14	—	—	—	27	—	
Wilde Winter Songbook	Released: 22 November 2013; Label: Wildeflower; Formats: CD, digital download	169	—	—	—	—	—	—	—	—	—	
Here Come the Aliens	Released: 16 March 2018; Label: Wildeflower; Formats: CD, LP, digital download	21	—	34	—	11	74	—	—	10	—	
Closer	Released: 31 January 2025; Label: Wildeflower, Cherry Red; Formats: CD, LP, digital download	27	—	14	—	11	—	—	—	10	—	
"—" denotes a recording that did not chart or was not released in that territory.

=== Live albums ===
Title	Details	Peak chart positions			
Title	Details	BEL (FL)	FRA	GER	SWI
Aliens Live	Released: 16 August 2019; Label: Ear Music; Formats: 2×CD, 2×LP	131	121	40	43

=== Compilation albums ===
Title	Details	Peak chart positions								Certifications
Title	Details	UK	AUS	AUT	FIN	GER	NLD	SWE	SWI	Certifications
The Very Best of Kim Wilde	Released: 9 July 1984; Label: RAK; Formats: CD, LP, cassette	78	13	—	34	61	—	—	25	
The Singles Collection 1981–1993	Released: 11 September 1993; Label: MCA; Formats: CD, LP, cassette	11	6	26	—	21	5	11	18	BPI: Gold; ARIA: Platinum; GLF: Gold; NVPI: Gold
The Very Best of Kim Wilde	Released: 5 November 2001; Label: EMI; Formats: CD, cassette	164	—	—	23	—	—	20	—	
The Hits Collection	Released: 16 August 2006; Label: EMI; Formats: CD, digital download	—	82	—	—	—	—	—	—	
Pop Don't Stop	Released: 6 August 2021; Label: Cherry Red; Formats: 5-CD + 2-DVD	51	—	—	—	25	—	—	41	
"—" denotes a recording that did not chart or was not released in that territory.

=== Remix albums ===
Title	Details	Peak chart positions
Title	Details	AUS
The Remix Collection	Released: 13 December 1993; Label: MCA; Formats: CD, cassette	64

== Singles ==
=== 1980s ===
Title	Year	Peak chart positions											Certifications	Album
Title	Year	UK	AUS	AUT	BEL (FL)	FRA	GER	IRL	NLD	SWE	SWI	US	Certifications	Album
"Kids in America"	1981	2	5	12	4	2	5	2	8	2	5	25	BPI: Platinum; AUS: Gold	Kim Wilde
"Chequered Love"	1981	4	6	16	2	30	2	4	2	6	2	—	BPI: Silver	Kim Wilde
"Water on Glass"	1981	11	—	—	—	—	—	10	—	—	—	—		Kim Wilde
"Cambodia"	1981	12	7	4	2	1	2	15	5	1	1	—		Select
"Bitter Is Better" (Japan only)	1982	—	—	—	—	—	—	—	—	—	—	—		Select (bonus track on Japanese edition)
"View from a Bridge"	1982	16	7	10	4	11	6	16	7	4	2	—		Select
"Take Me Tonight" (Japan only)	1982	—	—	—	—	—	—	—	—	—	—	—		Select
"Child Come Away"	1982	43	76	—	25	16	36	—	47	10	6	—		Non-album single
"Love Blonde"	1983	23	32	—	7	16	26	29	13	7	11	—		Catch as Catch Can
"Dancing in the Dark"	1983	67	—	—	11	64	26	—	—	—	9	—		Catch as Catch Can
"House of Salome"	1984	—	—	—	36	—	—	—	—	—	—	—		Catch as Catch Can
"The Second Time" ("Go for It" in the United States)	1984	29	—	—	15	38	9	—	23	—	7	65		Teases & Dares
"The Touch"	1984	56	—	—	20	—	29	—	34	—	—	—		Teases & Dares
"Rage to Love"	1985	19	94	—	—	—	45	—	—	—	—	—		Teases & Dares
"Schoolgirl"	1986	—	—	—	—	82	38	—	36	—	—	—		Another Step
"Say You Really Want Me" (original North American release)	1986	—	—	—	—	—	—	—	—	—	—	—		Running Scared soundtrack and Another Step
"You Keep Me Hangin' On"	1986	2	1	20	16	6	8	2	17	—	2	1	BPI: Silver	Another Step
"Another Step (Closer to You)" (with Junior Giscombe)	1987	6	88	—	—	73	—	6	95	—	—	—		Another Step
"Say You Really Want Me"	1987	29	—	—	—	—	—	18	—	—	—	44		Another Step
"Rockin' Around the Christmas Tree" (with Mel Smith)	1987	3	—	—	—	—	—	4	—	20	—	—		Non-album single
"Hey Mister Heartache"	1988	31	—	—	—	—	13	22	35	—	12	—		Close
"You Came"	1988	3	34	8	10	5	5	3	11	7	3	41	BPI: Silver	Close
"Never Trust a Stranger"	1988	7	—	7	6	17	11	5	3	12	4	—		Close
"Four Letter Word"	1988	6	165	23	9	—	27	5	9	—	18	—		Close
"Love in the Natural Way"	1989	32	—	—	—	—	—	26	63	—	—	—		Close
"—" denotes a recording that did not chart or was not released in that territory.

=== 1990s ===
Title	Year	Peak chart positions										Certifications	Album
Title	Year	UK	AUS	AUT	BEL (FL)	FRA	GER	IRL	NLD	SWE	SWI	Certifications	Album
"It's Here"	1990	42	104	—	32	—	21	—	39	13	14		Love Moves
"Time"	1990	71	—	—	—	—	—	—	—	—	—		Love Moves
"Can't Get Enough (Of Your Love)"	1990	—	—	—	—	21	58	—	—	—	—		Love Moves
"I Can't Say Goodbye"	1990	51	—	—	—	—	—	—	—	—	—		Love Moves
"World in Perfect Harmony"	1991	—	—	—	—	—	—	—	—	—	—		Love Moves
"Love Is Holy"	1992	16	29	28	23	40	42	26	21	39	13		Love Is
"Heart Over Mind"	1992	34	—	—	—	—	—	—	—	—	—		Love Is
"Who Do You Think You Are?"	1992	49	159	—	—	—	58	—	66	—	—		Love Is
"Million Miles Away"	1992	—	154	—	—	—	—	—	—	—	—		Love Is
"If I Can't Have You"	1993	12	3	29	6	—	51	9	18	24	18	ARIA: Platinum	The Singles Collection; 1981–1993
"In My Life"	1993	54	78	—	—	—	78	—	—	—	—		The Singles Collection; 1981–1993
"Kids in America 1994"	1994	—	186	—	—	—	—	—	—	—	—		The Remix Collection
"Breakin' Away"	1995	43	147	—	—	—	79	—	—	—	—		Now & Forever
"This I Swear"	1996	46	140	—	—	—	91	—	—	—	—		Now & Forever
"Shame"	1996	79	—	—	—	—	—	—	—	—	—		Non-album single
"—" denotes a recording that did not chart or was not released in that territory.

=== 2000s–present ===
Title	Year	Peak chart positions										Album
Title	Year	UK	AUT	BEL (FL)	DEN	FIN	GER	ITA	NLD	SWE	SWI	Album
"Loved"	2001	—	—	7	—	19	—	—	—	45	68	The Very Best of Kim Wilde
"Born to Be Wild"	2002	—	—	—	—	—	84	—	—	—	71	Non-album single
"Anyplace, Anywhere, Anytime" (with Nena)	2003	—	1	2	19	—	3	—	1	—	9	Nena feat. Nena
"Friday Night Kids" (Major Boys vs. Kim Wilde)	2006	—	—	—	—	11	—	—	—	—	—	Non-album single
"You Came 2006"	2006	—	24	33	—	—	20	36	30	25	19	Never Say Never
"Perfect Girl"	2006	—	—	— (Note: "Perfect Girl" did not enter the Ultratop 50, but peaked at number 16 on the Flemish Ultratip chart.)	—	—	52	—	—	—		Never Say Never
"Together We Belong"	2007	—	—	—	—	—	—	—	—	—	—	Never Say Never
"Baby Obey Me" (featuring Ill Inspecta)	2007	—	—	—	—	—	—	—	—	—	—	Never Say Never
"Run to You" (with Fibes, Oh Fibes!)	2009	—	—	—	—	—	—	—	—	24	—	1987
"Lights Down Low"	2010	—	—	—	—	—	34	—	—	—	62	Come Out and Play
"It's Alright" / "Sleeping Satellite"	2011	—	—	—	—	—	98	—	—	—	—	Snapshots
"To France"	2011	—	—	—	—	—	—	—	—	—	—	Snapshots
"Ever Fallen in Love" / "Spirit in the Sky"	2012	—	—	—	—	—	—	—	—	—	—	Snapshots
"I Believe" (with DJ BoBo)	2013	—	—	—	—	—	—	—	—	—	—	Reloaded
"F U Kristmas!" (with Lawnmower Deth)	2017	—	—	—	—	—	—	—	—	—	—	Non-album single
"Pop Don't Stop"	2018	—	—	—	—	—	—	—	—	—	—	Here Come the Aliens
"Kandy Krush"	2018	—	—	—	—	—	—	—	—	—	—	Here Come the Aliens
"Birthday"	2018	—	—	—	—	—	—	—	—	—	—	Here Come the Aliens
"You Keep Me Hangin' On" (live in Vienna)	2019	—	—	—	—	—	—	—	—	—	—	Aliens Live
"Numinous"	2020	—	—	—	—	—	—	—	—	—	—	Pop Don't Stop
"Shine On" (with Boy George)	2021	— (Note: "Shine On" did not enter the UK Singles Chart, but reached number one on the UK Vinyl Singles Chart.)	—	—	—	—	—	—	—	—	—	Pop Don't Stop
"You're My Karma" (with Tom Aspaul)	2021	—	—	—	—	—	—	—	—	—	—	Pop Don't Stop
"Trail of Destruction"	2024	— (Note: "Trail of Destruction" did not enter the UK Singles Chart, but peaked at number 59 on the UK Singles Downloads Chart, and at number 29 on both the UK Physical Singles and UK Vinyl Singles charts.)	—	—	—	—	—	—	—	—	—	Closer
"Midnight Train"	2024	— (Note: "Midnight Train" did not enter the UK Singles Chart, but peaked at number 29 on the UK Singles Sales Chart, number 8 on the UK Physical Singles Chart, and at number 7 on the UK Vinyl Singles Chart.)	—	—	—	—	—	—	—	—	—	Closer
"Scorpio"	2025	—	—	—	—	—	—	—	—	—	—	Closer
"—" denotes a recording that did not chart or was not released in that territory.												Closer

=== As featured artist ===
List of singles as featured artist, with selected chart positions, showing year released and album name
Title	Year	Peak chart positions	Album
Title	Year	BEL (FL) Tip	Album
"Les nuits sans Kim Wilde" (Laurent Voulzy featuring Kim Wilde)	1985	—	Non-album singles
"A Beautiful House" (Reflekt featuring Kim Wilde)	2012	—	Non-album singles
"Every Time I See You I Go Wild" (B.E.F. featuring Kim Wilde)	2013	—	Music of Quality and Distinction, Volume 3: Dark
"Superstars" (Born Crain featuring Kim Wilde)	2013	27	Identity
"You Keep Me Hangin' On" (Funkstar DeLuxe featuring Kim Wilde)	2013	—	Non-album single
"Shout Out" (with Kenny Thomas)	2025	—	Unstoppable
"—" denotes a recording that did not chart or was not released in that territory.

Various Artists The Anti-Heroin Project. Charity Single produced by Charles Foskett.

Guest appearances:John Parr, Elkie Brooks, Bonnie Tyler, Nik Kershaw, Holly Johnson, Kim Wilde, Hazel O'Connor, Cliff Richard, Robin Gibb, Mike Peters and others.

Year	Single	UK Chart
1986	"Live-In World" (The Anti-Heroin Project)	142

== Guest appearances ==
List of non-single guest appearances, with other performing artists, showing year released and album name
Title	Year	Other artist(s)	Album
"Tearaway"	1980	Ricky Wilde	None
"Turn It On"	1985	None	Weird Science: Music from the Motion Picture
"Because the Night"	1998	None	Philharmania
"If There Was Love"	2004	Nathan Moore	None
"Sorry Seems to Be the Hardest Word"	2007	Marty Wilde	Born to Rock and Roll: The Greatest Hits
"W.M." (Initial Talk Remix)"	2021	Tom Aspaul	Black Country Discothèque

== Videography ==
=== Video albums ===
Title	Details
Kim Wilde	Released: 1 January 1984; Label: Picture Music; Formats: VHS, Laserdisc
Another Step: The Video Singles	Released: 1 August 1987; Label: MCA; Format: VHS
Close: The Videos	Released: 23 March 1989; Label: Virgin; Format: VHS
Wilde Life	Released: 1 October 1992; Label: MCA; Format: VHS
The Singles Collection 1981–1993	Released: 1 December 1993; Label: MCA; Format: VHS
Love Blonde: The Best of Kim Wilde	Released: 1 June 1993; Label: EMI; Format: VHS

=== Music videos ===
List of music videos, showing year released and directors
Title	Year	Director(s)
"Kids in America"	1981	Brian Grant
"Chequered Love"	1981	Brian Grant
"Cambodia"	1981	Brian Grant
"View from a Bridge"	1982	Brian Grant
"Child Come Away"	1982	Tony van den Ende
"Love Blonde"	1983	Mike Mansfield
"Dancing in the Dark"	1983	Tim Pope
"The Second Time"	1984	Andy Morahan
"The Touch"	1984	
"Rage to Love"	1985	Pete Cornish
"Les nuits sans Kim Wilde" (Laurent Voulzy featuring Kim Wilde)	1985	Bernard Malige
"Schoolgirl"	1986	Peter Cornish
"You Keep Me Hangin' On"	1986	Greg Masuak
"Another Step (Closer to You)" (with Junior Giscombe)	1987	Greg Masuak
"Say You Really Want Me"	1987	Greg Masuak
"Rockin' Around the Christmas Tree" (with Mel Smith)	1987	
"Hey Mister Heartache"	1988	Brian Ward
"You Came"	1988	Greg Masuak
"Never Trust a Stranger"	1988	Greg Masuak
"Four Letter Word"	1988	Michael Geoghegan
"Love in the Natural Way"	1989	Neil Thompson
"It's Here"	1990	Greg Masuak
"Time"	1990	Greg Masuak
"Can't Get Enough (Of Your Love)"	1990	
"Love Is Holy"	1992	Zanna
"Heart Over Mind"	1992	Howard Greenhalgh
"Who Do You Think You Are?"	1992	Greg Masuak
"Million Miles Away"	1992	Zowie Broach
"If I Can't Have You"	1993	
"In My Life"	1993	
"Kids in America 1994"	1994	Michael Geoghegan
"Breakin' Away"	1995	Greg Masuak
"This I Swear"	1996	Daniela Federici
"Shame"	1996	Phil Griffin
"Born to Be Wild"	2002	Phil Griffin
"Anyplace, Anywhere, Anytime" (with Nena)	2003	Marcus Sternberg
"You Came 2006"	2006	Phil Griffin
"You Came 2006" (alternative "In Bed with Kim Wilde" version)	2006	
"Perfect Girl"	2006	Sandra Marschner
"Lights Down Low"	2010	
"It's Alright"	2011	Nikolaj Georgiew
"Sleeping Satellite"	2011	Nikolaj Georgiew
"Every Time I See You I Go Wild"	2013	
"Winter Wonderland"	2013	Sean J. Vincent
"Hope"	2013	Sean J. Vincent
"New Life"	2013	Sean J. Vincent
"Have Yourself a Merry Little Christmas"	2013	
"Burn Gold"	2013	
"Winter Song"	2013	Sean J. Vincent
"Hey Mister Snowman"	2013	Sean J. Vincent
"Let it Snow"	2013	Sean J. Vincent
"Song for Beryl"	2013	Sean J. Vincent
"Rockin' Around the Christmas Tree"	2013	Sean J. Vincent
"One"	2013	Sean J. Vincent
"White Winter Hymnal"	2013	Sean J. Vincent
"F U Kristmas!"	2017	
"Pop Don't Stop"	2018	
"Kandy Krush"	2018	
"Birthday"	2018	
"Birthday" (Wilde Party mix)	2018	
"Shine On" (with Boy George)	2021	
"Trail Of Destruction"	2024	Sean J. Vincent
"Midnight Train"	2024	Sean J. Vincent
