= Pop Don't Stop: Greatest Hits =

Greatest hits album by Kim Wilde
- Released: 6 August 2021
- Recorded: 1980–2021
- Studio: Various
- Genre: Pop
- Label: Cherry Red

Kim Wilde chronology
Aliens Live (2019)	Pop Don't Stop: Greatest Hits (2021)	Closer (2025)

Singles from Pop Don't Stop
- 1. "Numinous" Released: 15 May 2020; 2. "Shine On" Released: 24 June 2021; 3. "You're My Karma" Released: 23 July 2021

Pop Don't Stop: Greatest Hits
- Collectors Edition cover

Pop Don't Stop: Greatest Hits is a greatest hits collection by the English pop singer Kim Wilde. The album was announced on 15 May 2021 and released on 6 August 2021 as a 2-CD standard edition and a 5-CD + 2-DVD Collectors edition through Cherry Red Records. The collection includes seven UK top-10 singles, the new single "Shine On" with Boy George, and a B-sides collection, including four songs making their debut on CD.

== Critical reception ==
Professional ratings
Review scores
Source	Rating
Retropop	5/5 stars

Ange Chan from We Are Cult called the set "a masterclass in commercially produced pop music". Retropop gave the album a perfect 5 out of 5 saying "Not only does Pop Don't Stop bring together all of Kim's releases - including global chart hits and limited releases – it also marks the first time several tracks have been issued on CD, making the set ideal for longtime fans and new listeners."

== Track listing ==
CD1: Greatest Hits Part I
No.	Title	Writer(s)	Album	Length
1.	"The Second Time" (7" Version)	Marty Wilde; Ricky Wilde	Teases & Dares
2.	"Never Trust a Stranger" (7" version)	Kim Wilde; R. Wilde	Close
3.	"Million Miles Away" (7" version)	M. Wilde; R. Wilde	Love Is
4.	"Another Step (Closer to You)" (with Junior Giscombe; 7" version)	Steve Byrd; K. Wilde	Another Step
5.	"Heart over Mind" (7" version)	David Munday; Sandy Stewart; John Hall; Nick Whitecross	Love Is
6.	"Four Letter Word"	M. Wilde; R. Wilde	Close
7.	"Say You Really Want Me" (7" version)	Dick Rudolph; Danny Sembello; Donnell Spencer, Jr.	Another Step
8.	"Hey Mister Heartache" (7" version)	Byrd; K. Wilde	Close
9.	"Rage to Love" (7" remix)	M. Wilde; R. Wilde	Teases & Dares
10.	"Who Do You Think You Are"	K. Wilde; R. Wilde	Love Is
11.	"Can't Get Enough (Of Your Love)" (7" version)	K. Wilde; R. Wilde	Love Moves
12.	"Breakin' Away"	Tracy Ackerman; T. Lever; M. Percy	Now & Forever
13.	"Time"	K. Wilde; R. Wilde	Love Moves
14.	"Love Is Holy"	Rick Nowels; Ellen Shipley	Love Is
15.	"If I Can't Have You"	Barry Gibb; Maurice Gibb; Robin Gibb	The Singles Collection 1981–1993
16.	"This I Swear" (radio edit)	P. Sheyne; Tony Swain	Now & Forever
17.	"I Can't Say Goodbye" (7" version)	K. Wilde; R. Wilde	Love Moves
18.	"Love in the Natural Way"	K. Wilde; M. Wilde; R. Wilde	Close
19.	"You Came" (7" version)	K. Wilde; R. Wilde	Close
20.	"You Keep Me Hangin' On"	Holland–Dozier–Holland	Another Step

CD2: Greatest Hits Part II
No.	Title	Writer(s)	Album	Length
1.	"Kids in America"	M. Wilde; R. Wilde	Kim Wilde
2.	"Kandy Krush" (radio edit)	Frederick Thomander; Anders Wikström; K. Wilde; R. Wilde	Here Come the Aliens
3.	"Perfect Girl" (radio edit)	Uwe Fahrenkrog-Petersen; R. Wilde	Never Say Never
4.	"Water on Glass" (7" version)	M. Wilde; R. Wilde	Kim Wilde
5.	"A Little Respect" (7" version)	Andy Bell; Vince Clarke	Snapshots
6.	"View from a Bridge"	M. Wilde; R. Wilde	Select
7.	"Love Blonde" (7" version)	M. Wilde; R. Wilde	Catch as Catch Can
8.	"Together We Belong" (radio edit)	Fahrenkrog-Petersen; K. Wilde; R. Wilde	Never Say Never
9.	"Lights Down Low"	Anthony Galatis; Mark Frisch	Come Out and Play	3:00
10.	"Cambodia"	M. Wilde; R. Wilde	Select
11.	"Loved" (7" version)	Terry Ronald; R. Wilde	The Very Best of Kim Wilde (2001 album)
12.	"Pop Don't Stop" (radio edit)	K. Wilde; R. Wilde; Scarlett Wilde	Here Come the Aliens
13.	"Get Out"	Sacha Collisson; Pete Kirtley; Erik Nyholm	Come Out and Play
14.	"It's Alright" (radio edit)	Phil Harding; Ian Curnow; Richard Stannard; Neil James Stainton	Snapshots
15.	"Birthday" (radio edit)	Shane Lee; R. Wilde; S. Wilde	Here Come the Aliens
16.	"Real Life"	Dimitri Ehrlich; Alexander Geringas; Nyholm	Come Out and Play
17.	"Chequered Love"	M. Wilde; R. Wilde	Kim Wilde
18.	"Amoureux Des Rêves" (with Laurent Voulzy)	Steve Lee; K. Wilde; R. Wilde	Here Come the Aliens
19.	"Shine On" (with Boy George)	R. Wilde; K. Wilde; Thomander	previously unreleased	3:19
20.	"Numinous"	R. Wilde; K. Wilde	previously unreleased
21.	"You're My Karma" (with Tom Aspaul)	R. Wilde; S. Wilde	previously unreleased

CD3: Singles
No.	Title	Writer(s)	Album	Length
1.	"Bitter Is Better"	Bill Crunchfield; Masami Tsuchiya	Select (Japanese edition)
2.	"Child Come Away"	M. Wilde; R. Wilde	Non-album single
3.	"Dancing in the Dark" (radio edit)	Nicky Chinn; Paul Gurvitz	Catch as Catch Can
4.	"House of Salome"	M. Wilde; R. Wilde	Catch as Catch Can
5.	"The Touch" (7" version)	M. Wilde; R. Wilde	Teases & Dares
6.	"Schoolgirl"	K. Wilde; M. Wilde; R. Wilde	Another Step
7.	"It's Here"	K. Wilde; R. Wilde	Love Moves
8.	"World in Perfect Harmony"	K. Wilde; R. Wilde	Love Moves
9.	"In My Life" (West End 7" version)		The Singles Collection 1981–1993
10.	"Heaven" (Matt Darey 7" version)	K. Wilde; R. Wilde	Now & Forever
11.	"Shame" (Jupiter's Radio Mix)	John H. Fitch Jr.; Reuben Cross	The Singles Collection
12.	"Born to Be Wild" (radio mix)	Mars Bonfire	Non-album single
13.	"Baby Obey Me"	Jeff Coplan; R.E. Orrall; K. Wilde; R. Wilde	Never Say Never
14.	"Sleeping Satellite" (radio edit)	Tasmin Archer; John Beck; John Hughes	Snapshots
15.	"Spirit in the Sky"	Norman Greenbaum	Snapshots
16.	"F U Kristmas!" (with Lawnmower Deth)	Pete Lee; Steve Nesfield; Paddy O'Maley; K. Wilde; R. Wilde	Non-album single

CD4: B-Sides
No.	Title	Writer(s)	Album	Length
1.	"Shane"	M. Wilde; R. Wilde	"Chequered Love" B-side
2.	"Boys"	M. Wilde; R. Wilde	"Water on Glass" B-side
3.	"Watching for Shapes"	M. Wilde; R. Wilde	"Cambodia" B-side
4.	"Just Another Guy"	M. Wilde; R. Wilde	"Child Come Away" B-side
5.	"Back Seat Driver"	M. Wilde; R. Wilde	"Dancing in the Dark" B-side
6.	"Lovers on a Beach"	M. Wilde; R. Wilde	"The Second Time" B-side
7.	"Putty in Your Hands"	John Patton; K. Rogers	"Rage to Love" B-side
8.	"Loving You"	K. Wilde; R. Wilde	"You Keep Me Hangin On" B-side
9.	"Hold Back"	M. Wilde; R. Wilde	"Another Step (Closer to You)" B-side
10.	"Tell Me Where You Are"	K. Wilde; R. Wilde	"Hey Mr. Heartache" B-side
11.	"Wotcha Gonna Do"	K. Wilde; M. Wilde; R. Wilde	"Never Trust a Stranger" B-side
12.	"Virtual World"	K. Wilde; R. Wilde	"It's Here" B-side
13.	"Birthday Song"	K. Wilde; R. Wilde	"Love Is Holy" B-side
14.	"I've Found a Reason"	K. Wilde; R. Wilde	"Heart Over Mind" B-side
15.	"Never Felt So Alive"	K. Wilde; R. Wilde	"If I Can't Have You" B-side
16.	"Staying with My Baby"		Now & Forever (Japanese bonus track)
17.	"Snakes & Ladders"	Fredrik Thomander; Anders Wikström; K. Wilde	Come Out and Play (French deluxe edition bonus track)
18.	"Carry Me Home"	Thomander; Wikström; K. Wilde	Come Out and Play (French deluxe edition bonus track)
19.	"Party on the Brink"	Nick Beggs; Haylay Bonnick	Come Out and Play (French deluxe edition bonus track)
20.	"Addicted to You"	R. Wilde; Roxanne Wilde; Sean Vincent	Come Out and Play (French deluxe edition bonus track)

CD5: Remixes
No.	Title	Writer(s)	Length
1.	"Pop Don't Stop" (The 12" Remix)	K. Wilde; R. Wilde; S. Wilde
2.	"Can't Get Enough (Of Your Love)" (Club Mix)	K. Wilde; R. Wilde
3.	"Million Miles Away" (Club Mix)	M. Wilde; R. Wilde
4.	"Cambodia" (Paul Oakenfold Remix)	M. Wilde; R. Wilde
5.	"It's Alright" (Groove Coverage Remix)	Harding; Curnow; Stannard; Stainton
6.	"You Keep Me Hangin' On" (W.C.H. Club Mix)	Holland–Dozier–Holland
7.	"Kandy Krush" (Ricky W. 12" Remix)	Thomander; Wikström; K. Wilde; R. Wilde
8.	"Breakin' Away" (T'Empo Vocal)	Ackerman; Lever; Percy
9.	"You Came" (Tron Remix)	K. Wilde; R. Wilde
10.	"Perfect Girl" (Ian Finch Elektrika Mix)	Fahrenkrog-Petersen; R. Wilde
11.	"Birthday" (Wilde Party Mix)	Lee; R. Wilde; S. Wilde
12.	"Kids in America '94" (X Cut Cut)	M. Wilde; R. Wilde

DVD: Videos I
No.	Title	Length
1.	"Kids in America"
2.	"Chequered Love"
3.	"Water On Glass" (Top of the Pops performance)
4.	"Cambodia"
5.	"View from a Bridge"
6.	"Child Come Away"
7.	"Love Blonde"
8.	"Dancing in the Dark"
9.	"The Second Time"
10.	"The Touch"
11.	"Rage to Love"
12.	"Schoolgirl"
13.	"You Keep Me Hangin' On"
14.	"Another Step (Closer to You)" (with Junior)
15.	"Say You Really Want Me" (Short Version)
16.	"Hey Mister Heartache"
17.	"You Came"
18.	"Never Trust a Stranger"
19.	"Four Letter Word"
20.	"Love in the Natural Way"
21.	"It's Here"
22.	"Time"

DVD2: Videos II
No.	Title	Length
1.	"Can't Get Enough (Of Your Love)"
2.	"Love Is Holy"
3.	"Heart Over Mind"
4.	"Who Do You Think You Are"
5.	"Million Miles Away"
6.	"If I Can't Have You"
7.	"In My Life"
8.	"Kids in America ('94)"
9.	"Breakin' Away"
10.	"This I Swear"
11.	"Shame"
12.	"Born to Be Wild"
13.	"You Came (2006)"
14.	"Perfect Girl"
15.	"Lights Down Low"
16.	"It's Alright"
17.	"Sleeping Satellite"
18.	"Pop Don't Sop"
19.	"Kandy Krush"
20.	"Birthday"
21.	"Say You Really Want Me" (The Video Remix)
22.	"You Came (2006)" (In Bed with Kim Wilde Version)
23.	"Birthday" (Wilde Party Remix)
24.	"Numinous"
25.	"Shine On" (with Boy George)
26.	"2021 Interview"
27.	"Kim Looks Back at the Videos"

== Charts ==
Chart performance for Pop Don't Stop
Chart (2021)	Peak position
Belgian Albums (Ultratop Flanders)	135
Belgian Albums (Ultratop Wallonia)	32
French Albums (SNEP)	200
German Albums (Offizielle Top 100)	25
Scottish Albums (Official Charts)	8
Swiss Albums (Schweizer Hitparade)	41
UK Albums (Official Charts)	51
UK Independent Albums (Official Charts)	3

== Release history ==
Release history and formats for Pop Don't Stop
Region	Date	Format	Label	Catalogue
United Kingdom/Australia	6 August 2021	2×CD	Cherry Red	PCRPOPD222
United Kingdom/Australia	6 August 2021	5×CD+2×DVD	Cherry Red	PCRPOPD223
United Kingdom	25 March 2022	3×LP	Cherry Red	PCRPOPLPT236
