= The Singles Collection 1981–1993 =

Greatest hits album by Kim Wilde
- Released: 6 September 1993
- Recorded: 1980–1993
- Genre: Pop
- Length: 59:59
- Label: MCA
- Producers: Ricky Wilde; Marty Wilde; Tony Swain

Kim Wilde chronology
Love Is (1992)	The Singles Collection 1981–1993 (1993)	Now & Forever (1995)

Singles from The Singles Collection 1981–1993
- 1. "If I Can't Have You" Released: 28 June 1993; 2. "In My Life" Released: 25 October 1993

Professional ratings
Review scores
Source	Rating
AllMusic	4.5/5 stars
Music Week	3/5 stars
Select	2/5 medals

The Singles Collection 1981–1993 is a greatest hits album by English singer Kim Wilde, released on 6 September 1993 by MCA Records.

== Content ==
The album contains fifteen Top 20 hits from the UK and German charts, but omits hits such as "Hey Mr. Heartache" (Top 15 Germany) and "It's Here" (Top 15 in Sweden, Norway and Switzerland). Wilde recorded two new songs for the album—"In My Life" and the dancefloor-influenced single "If I Can't Have You" (a cover of the Yvonne Elliman song), which became her last UK Top 20 hit to date; in Australia it was one of the biggest hits of her career, reaching number three.

== Commercial performance ==
The album was certified Gold in the UK (where it reached number 11 on the UK Albums Chart), Germany and Australia. It was also released in the United States (the first since Close) and has, according to SoundScan, sold 36,000 copies there.

== Track listing ==
All tracks are written by Ricky Wilde and Marty Wilde, except where noted.

No.	Title	Writer(s)	Origin	Length
1.	"Kids in America"		Kim Wilde (1981)	3:25
2.	"Chequered Love"		Kim Wilde	3:20
3.	"Water on Glass"		Kim Wilde	3:35
4.	"Cambodia" (single version)		Select (1982)	3:56
5.	"View from a Bridge"		Select	3:29
6.	"Child Come Away"		non-album single (1982)	4:04
7.	"Love Blonde"		Catch as Catch Can (1983)	3:31
8.	"The Second Time"		Teases & Dares (1984)	3:52
9.	"Rage to Love"		Teases & Dares	4:17
10.	"You Keep Me Hangin' On"	Holland–Dozier–Holland	Another Step (1986)	4:14
11.	"Another Step (Closer to You)" (7" remix)	Kim Wilde; Steve Byrd	Another Step	3:30
12.	"You Came" (7" version)	R. Wilde; K. Wilde	Close (1988)	3:29
13.	"Never Trust a Stranger" (single mix)	R. Wilde; K. Wilde	Close	4:04
14.	"Four Letter Word"		Close	4:02
15.	"Love Is Holy"	Rick Nowels; Ellen Shipley	Love Is (1992)	4:01
16.	"If I Can't Have You"	Barry Gibb; Robin Gibb; Maurice Gibb	new track (1993)	3:26
17.	"In My Life" (album version)	R. Wilde; K. Wilde	new track (1993)	3:44

== Personnel ==
Adapted from the album's liner notes.

- Ricky Wilde – producer (tracks 1–14, 16, 17)
- Marty Wilde – co-producer (tracks 8, 9)
- Tony Swain – co-producer (tracks 12, 14)
- Rick Nowels – producer (track 15)
- Phil Kelsey – additional production, remix (track 16)

== Video album ==
A collection featuring twelve of Wilde's music videos was also made available. It was released on 1 December 1993 on VHS format.

=== Track listing ===
1. "Kids in America"
2. "Chequered Love"
3. "Cambodia"
4. "View from a Bridge"
5. "You Keep Me Hangin' On"
6. "Another Step (Closer to You)"
7. "You Came"
8. "Never Trust a Stranger"
9. "Four Letter Word"
10. "Love Is Holy"
11. "If I Can't Have You"
12. "Say You Really Want Me" (12" version)

== Charts ==
=== Weekly charts ===
Weekly chart performance for The Singles Collection 1981–1993
Chart (1993)	Peak position
Australian Albums (ARIA)	6
Austrian Albums (Ö3 Austria)	26
Danish Albums (Hitlisten)	1
Dutch Albums (Album Top 100)	5
European Albums (Music & Media)	19
Finnish Albums (Suomen virallinen lista)	4
German Albums (Offizielle Top 100)	21
Hungarian Albums (MAHASZ)	36
Swedish Albums (Sverigetopplistan)	11
Swiss Albums (Schweizer Hitparade)	18
UK Albums (Official Charts)	11

=== Year-end charts ===
Year-end chart performance for The Singles Collection 1981–1993
Chart (1993)	Position
Australian Albums (ARIA)	46
Dutch Albums (Album Top 100)	71

== Certifications and sales ==
Region	Certification	Certified units/sales
Australia (ARIA)	Platinum	70,000^{^}
Denmark	—	60,000
Netherlands (NVPI)	Gold	50,000^{^}
Sweden (GLF)	Gold	50,000^{^}
United Kingdom (BPI)	Gold	100,000^{^}
^{^} Shipments figures based on certification alone.
