= The Remix Collection (Kim Wilde album) =

Remix album by Kim Wilde
- Released: 13 December 1993
- Genre: Electronic
- Label: MCA

Professional ratings
Review scores
Source	Rating
AllMusic	link

The Remix Collection is a remix album by Kim Wilde. The album was released in 1993 in Japan and later in Australia. It contains some of her hits in long/extended versions and/or alternative remixes. For the first time available on CD are "The Second Time" (U.S. Mix), "Never Trust a Stranger" (Sanjazz Mix), and "Four Letter Word" (Late Night Mix). A techno-style mix of "Kids in America" is included.

To promote the remix collection and her 1994 Hits Tour (to support the promotion of the compilation The Singles Collection 1981–1993), "Kids in America 1994" was released as a single in May 1994 in several European countries, which featured remixes by Italian Eurodance project Cappella. The remix was not included on the remix compilation itself.

The album peaked at No. 64 on the Australian ARIA albums chart in March 1994.

== Track listing ==
1. "If I Can't Have You" (John Robinson Mix) – 4:36
2. "Kids in America" (The Maranza Mix) – 5:06
3. "The Second Time" (U.S. Remix) – 5:23
4. "Rage to Love" (Extended Version) – 5:59
5. "You Keep Me Hangin' On" (W.C.H. Mix) – 9:03
6. "Another Step (Closer to You)" (Extended Mix) – 5:51
7. "You Came" (The Close Remix) – 6:41
8. "Never Trust a Stranger" (Sanjazz Mix) – 5:44
9. "Four Letter Word" (Late Night Mix) – 3:55
10. "Love Is Holy" (Ambient Mix) – 4:44
11. "If I Can't Have You" (Extended Version) – 6:29
12. "In My Life" (West End 12" Remix) – 4:57

== Charts ==
Chart performance for The Remix Collection
Chart (1994)	Peak position
Australian Albums (ARIA)	64
