= Aliens Live =

Live album by Kim Wilde
- Released: 16 August 2019
- Recorded: 2018
- Label: Ear Music

Kim Wilde chronology
Here Come the Aliens (2018)	Aliens Live (2019)	Pop Don't Stop (2021)

Singles from Aliens Live
- 1. "You Keep Me Hangin' On" Released: August 2019

Aliens Live is the first live album by English singer Kim Wilde, released on 16 August 2019. The album was recorded in 18 cities during the 2018 live tour.

== Track listing ==
1. "Stereo Shot"
2. "Water on Glass"
3. "Never Trust a Stranger"
4. "Kandy Krush"
5. "Cambodia"
6. "Birthday"
7. "Yours 'til the End"
8. "Solstice"
9. "Words Fell Down"
10. "Bladerunner"
11. "Rosetta"
12. "Cyber.Nation.War"
13. 'View from a Bridge"
14. "Chequered Love"
15. "You Came"
16. 'You Keep Me Hangin' On"
17. "1969"
18. "Pop Don't Stop"
19. "Kids in America"

== Charts ==
Chart (2019)	Peak position
Belgian Albums (Ultratop Flanders)	131
French Albums (SNEP)	121
German Albums (Offizielle Top 100)	40
Swiss Albums (Schweizer Hitparade)	43
UK Independent Albums (OCC)	9
Scottish Albums (OCC)	47
