= Closer (Kim Wilde album) =

Studio album by Kim Wilde
- Released: 31 January 2025
- Recorded: 2023–2024
- Studio: Doghouse (Hertfordshire)
- Genre: Pop; synth-pop
- Length: 43:56
- Label: Cherry Red; Wildeflower
- Producer: Ricky Wilde

Kim Wilde chronology
Pop Don't Stop: Greatest Hits (2021)	Closer (2025)

Singles from Closer
- 1. "Trail of Destruction" Released: 23 August 2024; 2. "Midnight Train" Released: 22 November 2024; 3. "Scorpio" Released: December 2025

Closer is the fifteenth studio album by English singer and songwriter Kim Wilde. It was released on 31 January 2025 through Wildeflower Records and Cherry Red Records, following her 2018 studio album Here Come the Aliens.

== Critical reception ==
Professional ratings
Review scores
Source	Rating
MusicOMH	4/5 stars
Retropop	4/5 stars

Ben Hogwood of MusicOMH stated that the album "is truly a family affair", highlighting Wilde's voice which "has never sounded better" and praising the album's "versatility across several genres." He noted that Wilde's "piercing tones" cut through "the massive productions," complementing her "chrome-plated vocals perfectly." Connor Gotto of Retropop rated the album 4 stars, calling the album "effortlessly fresh" and deemed it "as strong as any other body of work from her career and a testament to the long-running legacy of one of British pop’s first families of music".

== Track listing ==
Closer track listing
No.	Title	Writer(s)	Length
1.	"Midnight Train"	Ricky Wilde	3:27
2.	"Scorpio"	R. Wilde; Scarlett Wilde	3:16
3.	"Trail of Destruction"	Kim Wilde; Darren Gilbert; R. Wilde; S. Wilde	4:03
4.	"Sorrow Replaced" (featuring Midge Ure)	K. Wilde; R. Wilde	4:16
5.	"Lighthouse"	K. Wilde; R. Wilde	5:46
6.	"Love Is Love"	K. Wilde; Steve Anderson; R. Wilde; S. Wilde	4:25
7.	"Rocket to the Moon"	R. Wilde; S. Wilde	4:22
8.	"Hourglass Human" (featuring Scarlett Wilde)	K. Wilde; R. Wilde	4:20
9.	"Stones and Bones"	K. Wilde; R. Wilde	5:06
10.	"Savasana"	K. Wilde; R. Wilde; S. Wilde	4:51
Total length:			43:56

== Personnel ==
- Kim Wilde – lead vocals
- Jonathan Atkinson – drums
- Paul Cooper – bass
- Cliff Masterson – string arrangement on "Sorrow Replaced"
- Sean J. Vincent – mixing, mastering, cover photography, design
- Ricky Wilde – guitars, programming, keyboards, production, mixing
- Scarlett Wilde – backing vocals

== Charts ==
Chart performance for Closer
Chart (2025)	Peak position
Austrian Albums (Ö3 Austria)	14
Belgian Albums (Ultratop Flanders)	161
Belgian Albums (Ultratop Wallonia)	35
French Albums (SNEP)	94
German Albums (Offizielle Top 100)	11
Scottish Albums (OCC)	6
Swiss Albums (Schweizer Hitparade)	10
UK Albums (OCC)	27
UK Independent Albums (OCC)	3
