= Love in the Natural Way =

Single by Kim Wilde

from the album Close
- B-side: "You'll Be the One Who'll Lose"
- Released: 20 February 1989
- Recorded: 1988
- Genre: Pop
- Length: 4:18
- Label: MCA
- Songwriter(s): Kim Wilde, Ricki Wilde, Marty Wilde
- Producer(s): Ricki Wilde, Tony Swain

Kim Wilde singles chronology
"Four Letter Word" (1988)	"Love in the Natural Way" (1989)	"It's Here" (1990)

Music video
- "Love in the Natural Way" on YouTube

"Love in the Natural Way" is the fifth and final single from Close, the best-selling album by Kim Wilde.

Issued in the UK and Germany in early 1989 on 7", 12" and CD-single (the latter two also containing an extended version of the track), it did not match the success of the other singles from that album the previous year.

This was Wilde's final release of the 1980s, the decade in which she had become the biggest selling British female soloist.

== Critical reception ==
Tony Parsons left rough negative review on a single for New Musical Express by saying that "all those songs written with her dad and brother oozing shallow emotion". Reviewers of Melody Maker expressed similar opinion: "It's simply a priggish plea for honesty set to the customary saccharin blather" and summarised that the song addressed "for those of us who still care enough to dream".

== Chart performance ==
Chart (1989)	Peak position
Ireland (IRMA)	26
Netherlands (Single Top 100)	63
UK Singles (OCC)	32
Europe (Eurochart Hot 100)	88
