= F U Kristmas! =

Single by Kim Wilde and Lawnmower Deth
- B-side: "Fuck You Kristmas!"
- Released: 1 December 2017 (Streaming); 18 December 2017 (Digital, CD)
- Recorded: 2017
- Genre: Thrash metal, Pop punk, Rock
- Length: 2:57
- Label: Wildeflower Records
- Songwriter(s): Pete Lee, Paddy O'Maley, Steve Nesfield, Kim Wilde, Ricky Wilde
- Producer(s): Ricky Wilde

Kim Wilde singles chronology
"Ever Fallen in Love" (2012)	"F U Kristmas!" (2017)	"Pop Don't Stop" (2018)

Lawnmower Deth singles chronology
"Kids in America" (1991)	"F U Kristmas!" (2017)

Music video
- "F U Kristmas!" by Kim Wilde and Lawnmower Deth on YouTube

"F U Kristmas!" is a Christmas single by the English singer Kim Wilde and thrash metal band Lawnmower Deth. The single was released in the United Kingdom as a digital download on iTunes and Google Play Music and on CD on 18 December 2017.

There are two versions of the main track, both with parental advisories for strong language: "F U Kristmas! (Clean Mix)" and "Fuck You Kristmas! (Sweary Mix)", the lyrics of the latter containing more explicit language. Both versions were made available on streaming sites Apple Music and Deezer on 1 December 2017.

== Background ==
The song was written by Pete Lee, Paddy O'Maley, Steve Nesfield and Kim and Ricky Wilde and recorded by Kim Wilde and Lawnmower Deth in 2017. It has been described as an "anti-Christmas song" and a "punk and thrash-metal crossover number with thrashing riffs and hardcore vocals."

Wilde described working with the band as a "collaboration bound to happen" since joining them on stage at Download Festival in 2016, adding it was "a personal highlight of [her] career." She has previously stated that Lawnmower Deth’s cover of her debut single "Kids in America" is her favourite version of the track and credited the band with the idea of them collaborating on a Christmas song. Pete Lee, vocalist for Lawnmower Deth, said the collaboration was "the greatest project [the band has] been involved in."

== Music video ==
A music video accompanying the release of "F U Kristmas!" was released onto Kim Wilde's Vevo YouTube channel on 1 December 2017 at a total length of three minutes and one second.

== Track listing ==
Digital download, CD
No.	Title	Length
1.	"F U Kristmas! (Clean Mix)"	2:57
2.	"Fuck You Kristmas! (Sweary Mix)"	2:57
