= Bad Boy (Marty Wilde song) =

1959 single by Marty Wilde

Single by Marty Wilde
- B-side: "It's Been Nice" (UK); "Teenage Tears" (US)
- Released: 18 November 1959
- Genre: Rockabilly; rock and roll
- Length: 2:22
- Label: Philips; Epic
- Songwriter(s): Marty Wilde
- Producer(s): Ivor Raymonde

Marty Wilde singles chronology
"Sea of Love" (1959)	"Bad Boy" (1959)	"Johnny Rocco" (1960)

"Bad Boy" is a song by rock and roll singer Marty Wilde, released as a single in November 1959. It peaked at number 7 on the UK Singles Chart and number 45 on the Billboard Hot 100.

== Release and reception ==
Announcing the release of the single in Disc, producer Jack Good wrote that "It's Been Nice", written by Doc Pomus and Mort Shuman, was the "top side". However, he also said that he thought "Bad Boy" was "a toss-up which [would] develop as the top side". Promoting the single several weeks later, it was described as a "double-sided smash… Bad Boy coupled with It's Been Nice".

Mort Shuman had intended to give "It's Been Nice" to Elvis Presley, but instead gave it to Wilde after the two struck up an instant friendship.

In the US and Canada, "Bad Boy" released with the B-side "Teenage Tears", which had been the B-side to Wilde's previous single "Sea of Love". "Bad Boy" was released in the US at the beginning of January 1960 and became the first of two hits there for Wilde.

Reviewed in Melody Maker, "Bad Boy" was described as "easy going, with a folk-sounding air about it".

== Track listing ==
7": Philips / PB.972

1. "Bad Boy" – 2:22
2. "It's Been Nice" – 1:55

7": Epic / 5-9356 (US & Canada)

1. "Bad Boy" – 2:22
2. "Teenage Tears" – 2:20

== Charts ==
Chart (1960)	Peak position
Australia (Kent Music Report)	41
Canada (CHUM)	47
UK Singles (OCC)	7
US Billboard Hot 100	45
US Cash Box Top 100	50

== Cover versions ==
- In December 1959, American rock and roll singer Robin Luke released a cover of the song as a single.
- In 1960, Australian rock and roll singer Dig Richards covered the song on his album Bad Boy.
- In 1964, French singer Françoise Hardy released a French-language version, titled "Pas gentille", on her album Mon amie la rose.
- In 1965, South African band Gene Rockwell and the Falcons covered the song on their album The Many Faces of Gene Rockwell.
- In 1966, Danish band Sir Henry and His Butlers covered the song on their album A Portrait of Sir Henry and His Butlers.
- In 1976, British singer Freddie Starr released a cover of the song as a single.
- In 1980, American rockabilly singer Robert Gordon covered the song on his album Bad Boy.
