= Perfect Girl (song) =

Single by Kim Wilde

from the album Never Say Never
- B-side: "European Soul" (acoustic version)
- Released: 17 November 2006
- Genre: Pop
- Length: 3:45 (album version); 3:17 (radio edit)
- Label: EMI
- Songwriters: Uwe Fahrenkrog-Petersen; Ricki Wilde
- Producers: Uwe Fahrenkrog-Petersen; Gena Wernik

Kim Wilde singles chronology
"You Came (2006)" (2006)	"Perfect Girl" (2006)	"Together We Belong" (2007)

"Perfect Girl" is a song by the English pop singer Kim Wilde, released as the second single from her album Never Say Never, released in 2006. The album contains new songs (including this one) as well as re-recorded versions of some of Wilde's 1980s hits.

Released in Germany, the single contained the "Radio Edit" of the song, but also two remixes. It also contained a new acoustic version of "European Soul" from Wilde's 1988 best-selling album Close.

== Track listing ==
CD single 1

1. "Perfect Girl" (radio edit)
2. "European Soul" (acoustic version)

CD single 2

1. "Perfect Girl" (radio edit)
2. "Perfect Girl" (Perfect Chill mix)
3. "Perfect Girl" (Ian Finch Elektrika mix)
4. "European Soul" (acoustic version)

== Charts ==
Chart performance for "Perfect Girl"
Chart (2006)	Peak position
Belgium (Ultratip Bubbling Under Flanders)	16
Germany (GfK)	52
