= Here Come the Aliens =

Studio album by Kim Wilde
- Released: 16 March 2018
- Recorded: 2017
- Genre: Pop rock
- Length: 49:22
- Label: Wildeflower
- Producer: Ricky Wilde

Kim Wilde chronology
Wilde Winter Songbook (2013)	Here Come the Aliens (2018)	Aliens Live (2019)

Singles from Here Come the Aliens
- 1. "Pop Don't Stop" Released: 30 January 2018; 2. "Kandy Krush" Released: 23 March 2018; 3. "Birthday" Released: 22 June 2018; 4. "Amoureux des Reves" Released: 1 October 2018

Here Come the Aliens is the fourteenth studio album by the English pop singer Kim Wilde, released on 16 March 2018 by Wildeflower Records. It is her first studio album since Wilde Winter Songbook (2013). It contains the singles "Pop Don't Stop", "Kandy Krush" and "Birthday", while a deluxe edition released in October housed the single "Amoureux des rêves". The album was produced by her long-time producer (and brother) Ricky Wilde. In the United Kingdom, the album became her first charting album for 25 years, peaking at number 21.

== Background and release ==
Wilde released her fourteenth studio album on 16 March 2018, over four years since her last. According to Wilde, the theme of the album was inspired by her seeing a UFO in her back garden in Hertfordshire in 2009. Written by her, her brother Ricky Wilde, niece Scarlett, and sister Roxanne Wilde, it was her first album to chart within the top 100 of the UK Albums Chart since 1993, peaking at number 21 during a two-week run. Elsewhere in Europe, the album reached number 10 in Switzerland, number 11 in Germany, number 34 in Austria, number 48 in Belgium, number 74 in the Netherlands and number 124 in France. In support of the album, Wilde toured the UK during March and April 2018 and later in Europe.

The album met mixed to positive reviews, with musicOMH saying that the album was powerful, but at times was a bit too much, stating: "...the pop machine continues churning out track after track, proving that Wilde certainly does still have a knack for writing pleasing songs. But, flowing like a thick, melodic river that threatens to drown you every so often, it borders on being too much." The Arts Desk said that "the production falls somewhere between Def Leppard's Hysteria, Pat Benatar and Wilde's own early Eighties back catalogue."

A deluxe edition of the album was released in October 2018, containing two new tracks and live versions of her past singles "Kids in America", "Cambodia" and "You Came".

== Track listing ==
1. "1969" (Kim Wilde, Ricky Wilde) – 4:04
2. "Pop Don't Stop" (K. Wilde, R. Wilde, Scarlett Wilde) – 3:50
3. "Kandy Krush" (Anders Wikström, Frederick Thomander, K. Wilde, R. Wilde) – 3:15
4. "Stereo Shot" (R. Wilde, S. Wilde) – 3:39
5. "Yours 'Til the End" (Neil Jones, R. Wilde) – 4:35
6. "Solstice" (K. Wilde / R. Wilde, S. Wilde) – 5:23
7. "Addicted to You" (R. Wilde, Roxanne Wilde, Sean J. Vincent) – 3:44
8. "Birthday" (R. Wilde, S. Wilde, Shane Lee) – 3:38
9. "Cyber.Nation.War" (K. Wilde, R. Wilde) – 4:55
10. "A Different Story" (Wikström, Thomander, K. Wilde) – 3:41
11. "Rock the Paradiso" (K. Wilde, R. Wilde, S. Wilde) – 3:45
12. "Rosetta" (K. Wilde, R. Wilde) – 4:46

Deluxe edition bonus disc

1. "Amoureux des Reves" (K. Wilde, R. Wilde, Steve Lee) – 3:47
2. "Fight Temptation" (Peredur Ap Gwenedd, R. Wilde, S. Wilde) – 3:35
3. "Yours Til the End (Infinity Mix)" – 7:13
4. "Stereo Shot/1969/Different Story (Numinous Mix)" – 5:00
5. "Cyber Nation War (Keyboard Warrior Mix)" – 6:00
6. "You Came Live 2018" (K. Wilde, R. Wilde) – 4:54
7. "Cambodia Live 2018" (R. Wilde, Marty Wilde) – 5:32
8. "Kids in America Live 2018" (R. Wilde, M. Wilde) – 5:59

== Personnel ==
- Kim Wilde – lead vocals
- Ricky Wilde – production, keyboards, guitar, backing vocals, mixing
- Neil Jones – guitar
- Paul Cooper – bass
- Jonathan Atkinson – drums
- Scarlett Wilde – backing vocals, album artwork
- Hal Fowler – voice over vocals on "1969"
- Frida Sundemo – guest vocals on "Rosetta"
- Kirsty Cooper – design
- Sean J. Vincent – mixing, design
- Tim Young – mastering
- Connor Panayi – mixing assistance

== Charts ==
Chart (2018)	Peak position
Austrian Albums (Ö3 Austria)	34
Belgian Albums (Ultratop Flanders)	48
Belgian Albums (Ultratop Wallonia)	93
Dutch Albums (Album Top 100)	74
French Albums (SNEP)	124
German Albums (Offizielle Top 100)	11
Scottish Albums (Official Charts)	10
Swiss Albums (Schweizer Hitparade)	10
UK Albums (Official Charts)	21
UK Independent Albums (Official Charts)	4
