= Schoolgirl (song) =

Single by Kim Wilde

from the album Another Step
- B-side: "Songs About Love"
- Released: 8 June 1986
- Recorded: 1986
- Genre: Dance-pop
- Length: 3:43
- Label: MCA
- Songwriter(s): Ricki Wilde, Marty Wilde, Kim Wilde
- Producer(s): Ricki Wilde, Reinhold Heil

Kim Wilde singles chronology
"Rage to Love" (1985)	"Schoolgirl" (1986)	"Say You Really Want Me" (1986)

"Schoolgirl" is the first single from the 1986 album Another Step by Kim Wilde.

Released in Australia and several European countries (although not the UK), it was the first single of Wilde's career on which she was given co-writing credits. She was given sole writing and production credits on "Songs About Love", the B-side to the single. "Schoolgirl" was inspired by Wilde's younger sister, Roxanne, and was written shortly after the Chernobyl disaster.

The 12" release of the single featured an extended remix called the Head Master-Mix.

== Chart performance ==
Chart (1986)	Peak position
Denmark	7
Germany (GfK Entertainment Charts)	38
Netherlands (Single Top 100)	36
