= The Touch (Kim Wilde song) =

Single by Kim Wilde

from the album Teases & Dares
- B-side: "Shangri-La"
- Released: 26 November 1984
- Recorded: 1984
- Genre: Pop; new wave; hi-NRG
- Length: 4:13 (Album Version); 4:05 (7" Version); 6:34 (Extended Version)
- Label: MCA
- Songwriters: Ricki Wilde; Marty Wilde
- Producer: Ricki Wilde

Kim Wilde singles chronology
"The Second Time" (1984)	"The Touch" (1984)	"Rage to Love" (1985)

Music video
- "The Touch" on YouTube

"The Touch" is a song by the English pop singer Kim Wilde. It was the second single to be released from her fourth studio album Teases & Dares (1984). Released on 26 November 1984 by MCA Records, it peaked at No. 56 on the UK singles chart.

"The Touch" was released as both a 7" and a 12" single. The 7" had a remix of the album version on side A, and a track written by Wilde herself on side B entitled "Shangri-La", also from the Teases & Dares album. Both tracks were extended for the 12" release. It also featured in the soundtrack of the American teen romantic comedy film Secret Admirer (1985).

The music video for "The Touch" features Wilde playing Cinderella.

== Charts ==
Chart (1984–1985)	Peak position
Belgium (Ultratop 50 Flanders)	20
Germany (GfK)	29
Netherlands (Single Top 100)	34
UK Singles (Official Charts)	56
