= Marty Wilde =

British singer (born 1939)

Marty Wilde MBE
- Born: Reginald Leonard Smith; 15 April 1939 (age 87); Blackheath, London, England
- Genres: Rock and roll; rockabilly; pop
- Occupations: Singer; songwriter
- Years active: 1957–present
- Labels: Philips; Kaleidoscope Records Limited (UK); Epic (US)
- Website: martywilde.com
- Children: Kim Wilde; Ricky Wilde; Roxanne Wilde; Marty Jr

Marty Wilde (born Reginald Leonard Smith; 15 April 1939) is an English singer. He was among the first generation of British pop stars to emulate American rock and roll, scoring several 1950s and 1960s hit singles including "Endless Sleep", "Sea of Love" and "Bad Boy". During the late 1960s to early 1980s, Wilde continued to record and, with Ronnie Scott, co-wrote hit singles for others including the Casuals' "Jesamine" and Status Quo's "Ice in the Sun". He is the father of pop singer Kim Wilde and co-wrote many of her hit singles including "Kids in America" with his son Ricky. He continues to perform and record.

== Career ==
Wilde was born in Blackheath, London. He was performing under the name Reg Patterson at London's Condor Club in 1957, when he was spotted by impresario Larry Parnes.

Parnes gave his protégés stage names such as Billy Fury, Duffy Power and Dickie Pride, hence the change to Wilde.

From mid-1958 to the end of 1959 Wilde was one of the leading British rock-and-roll singers, along with Tommy Steele and Cliff Richard. Wilde's backing group was called the Wildcats. At various times they featured Big Jim Sullivan on lead guitar, Tony Belcher on rhythm guitar, Bobby Graham or Bobbie Clarke on drums, plus Brian Locking on bass guitar and Brian Bennett on drums, both of whom later joined the Shadows.

Wilde appeared as a teen idol singer in the 1959 airplane disaster film Jet Storm, alongside stars including Richard Attenborough. Wilde sang the song "Jet Stream" that played over the opening credits, where he was credited as “introducing Marty Wilde” (it was also originally supposed to be the title of the film).

Wilde appeared regularly on the BBC Television show 6.5 Special and was the main regular artiste on the Saturday ITV popular music shows Oh Boy! and Boy Meets Girls. There he met Joyce Baker, one of the Vernons Girls who were also show regulars. Their courtship was made public but after their marriage Wilde's popularity as a teen idol declined.

Wilde moved partly into all-round entertainment, appearing in musicals such as Conrad Birdie in the original West End production of Bye Bye Birdie and several films. He enjoyed success as a songwriter in the late 1960s and early 1970s. In collaboration with the songwriter Ronnie Scott, he co-wrote the Casuals' "Jesamine" under the pseudonyms of Frere Manston and Jack Gellar. The pair also wrote Lulu's "I'm a Tiger" and the early Status Quo hit, "Ice in the Sun".

Wilde also tried to tap into the growing glam rock boom, releasing the single "Rock'n'Roll Crazy" / "Right On!" billed as Zappo, and recording as The Dazzling All Night Rock Show ("20 Fantastic Bands"), and Ruby Pearl and The Dreamboats ("The Shang-A-Lang Song"). None of the releases were a commercial success, and Wilde ditched the glam rock genre, going on to work with his son, Ricky Wilde.

Working with producer Pete Bellotte, Wilde recorded for the Kaleidoscope Records Limited label and released the single, "In Dreams" bw "Hard to Find, Easy to Lose" in 1982.

Like many of his contemporaries, Wilde continued to perform in nostalgia tours in the UK and beyond. In 2007, he celebrated 50 years in the business with another UK tour which featured his youngest daughter Roxanne Wilde, and the issue of a compilation album, Born To Rock And Roll – The Greatest Hits. It included a duet with Kim Wilde of Elton John's "Sorry Seems to Be the Hardest Word", which was released as a promotional only single.

In 2017, Wilde went on a UK tour with The Solid Gold Rock'n'Roll Show, which also featured Eden Kane, Mark Wynter and Mike Berry.

In 2019, he toured the UK again with American artist Charlie Gracie and Mike Berry. A projected 2020 tour was rescheduled to 2021 because of the COVID-19 pandemic.

On 9 October 2020, Wilde entered the UK Albums Chart at number 75 with Running Together. It was released on his own Pushka label, and featured his daughters Kim and Roxanne Wilde, with input from son Ricky. Wilde thus has the distinction of UK chart success, as either a singer or songwriter, across eight consecutive decades.

== Family ==
He and his wife, Joyce, have four children, Kim (born 1960), Ricky (born 1961), Roxanne (born 1979) and the youngest, Marty Jr (born 1981), who was a contestant on the Golf Channel's The Big Break IV: USA vs. Europe in 2005. Kim, Ricky and Roxanne have worked in the music industry, like their parents.

== Songwriting ==
Wilde wrote and co-wrote the following notable songs:

- "Bad Boy" – Robin Luke, Robert Gordon, Nirvana, Françoise Hardy (song title styled as "Pas Gentille")
- "Cambodia" – Kim Wilde
- "Chequered Love" – Kim Wilde
- "Child Come Away" – Kim Wilde
- "Ego" – Kim Wilde
- "Four Letter Word" – Kim Wilde
- "House of Salome" – Kim Wilde
- "I'm A Tiger" – Lulu
- "Ice in the Sun" – Status Quo
- "Jesamine" – The Casuals
- "It's Here" – Kim Wilde
- "Kids in America" – Kim Wilde
- "Love Blonde" – Kim Wilde
- "Love in the Natural Way" – Kim Wilde
- "Never Trust a Stranger" – Kim Wilde
- "Rage to Love" – Kim Wilde
- "Schoolgirl" – Kim Wilde
- "The Second Time" – Kim Wilde
- "The Touch" – Kim Wilde
- "View from a Bridge" – Kim Wilde
- "Water on Glass" – Kim Wilde
- "Young Heroes" – Kim Wilde

== Filmography ==
Marty Wilde has appeared in the following films:-

- Jet Storm (1959)
- The Hellions (1961)
- What a Crazy World (1963)
- Stardust (1974)

== See also ==
- List of show business families
- List of Epic Records artists
