= Hey Mister Heartache =

Single by Kim Wilde

from the album Close
- B-side: "Tell Me Where You Are"
- Released: 3 May 1988
- Recorded: 1987
- Length: 4:36 (album version); 3:51 (7-inch version)
- Label: MCA
- Songwriters: Kim Wilde; Steve Byrd
- Producers: Ricki Wilde; Tony Swain

Kim Wilde singles chronology
"Rockin' Around the Christmas Tree" (1987)	"Hey Mister Heartache" (1988)	"You Came" (1988)

Music video
- "Hey Mister Heartache" on YouTube

"Hey Mister Heartache" is a song by the English pop singer Kim Wilde, released as the first single from her sixth studio album, Close (1988). The song features vocals by Junior Giscombe; this part of the song was edited down for the single version. The song was also extended for the 12-inch and CD-single formats, and a second 12-inch featuring the "Kilo Watt" remix by Timmy Regisford was also released in the UK. Although a minor hit in Wilde's native UK, "Hey Mister Heartache" was a top-20 entry throughout Europe. The music video contains an appearance by actor Jesse Birdsall.

== Track listings ==
7-inch single

A. "Hey Mister Heartache" – 3:51
B. "Tell Me Where You Are" – 3:11

12-inch and mini-CD single

1. "Hey Mister Heartache" – 8:05
2. "Hey Mister Heartache" (album version) – 4:36
3. "Tell Me Where You Are" – 3:11

12-inch remix single

A1. "Hey Mister Heartache" (Kilo Watt remix)
B1. "Hey Mister Heartache" (album version) – 4:36
B2. "Tell Me Where You Are" – 3:11

CD single

1. "Hey Mister Heartache" – 8:07
2. "Tell Me Where You Are" – 3:12
3. "You Keep Me Hangin' On" – 4:14
4. "Another Step (Closer to You)" (with Junior) – 3:33

== Charts ==
Weekly chart performance for "Hey Mister Heartache"
Chart (1988)	Peak position
Europe (Eurochart Hot 100)	24
Finland (Suomen virallinen lista)	25
Ireland (IRMA)	22
Italy (Musica e dischi)	8
Italy Airplay (Music & Media)	15
Netherlands (Dutch Top 40)	37
Netherlands (Single Top 100)	35
Norway (VG-lista)	3
Switzerland (Schweizer Hitparade)	12
UK Singles (Official Charts)	31
West Germany (GfK)	13
