= Love Blonde =

Single by Kim Wilde

from the album Catch as Catch Can
- B-side: "Can You Hear It"
- Released: 18 July 1983
- Recorded: 1983
- Genre: Jazz; swing; rockabilly
- Length: 4:08 (Album Version); 3:35 (7" Version); 4:54 (12" Version)
- Label: RAK
- Songwriters: Ricky Wilde, Marty Wilde
- Producer: Ricky Wilde

Kim Wilde singles chronology
"Child Come Away" (1982)	"Love Blonde" (1983)	"Dancing in the Dark" (1983)

"Love Blonde" is a song by English singer Kim Wilde, released as the first single from her third album, Catch as Catch Can (1983). The song sold moderately, restoring some of the ground lost from her previous release "Child Come Away" and is reputedly about Wilde herself. It features Gary Barnacle on saxophone. It marked the first occasion where Wilde released a 12" extended version of one of her singles, and the first time she released a 12" single in her home country (she had previously released 12" singles in Europe, but merely featuring the normal version of the single). The UK edition of the 12" single included a free poster. The version on the 7" single was slightly shorter than that on the original LP.

== Charts ==
=== Weekly charts ===
Chart (1983)	Peak position
Belgium (Ultratop 50 Flanders)	7
Finland (Suomen virallinen lista)	3
Ireland (Irish Singles Chart)	29
Luxembourg (Radio Luxembourg)	12
Netherlands (Dutch Top 40)	10
Netherlands (Single Top 100)	13
Sweden (Sverigetopplistan)	7
Switzerland (Schweizer Hitparade)	11
UK Singles (Official Charts)	23
West Germany (GfK)	26

=== Year-end charts ===
Chart (1983)	Position
Belgium (Ultratop Flanders)	69
