= Kim Wilde =

English pop singer (born 1960)

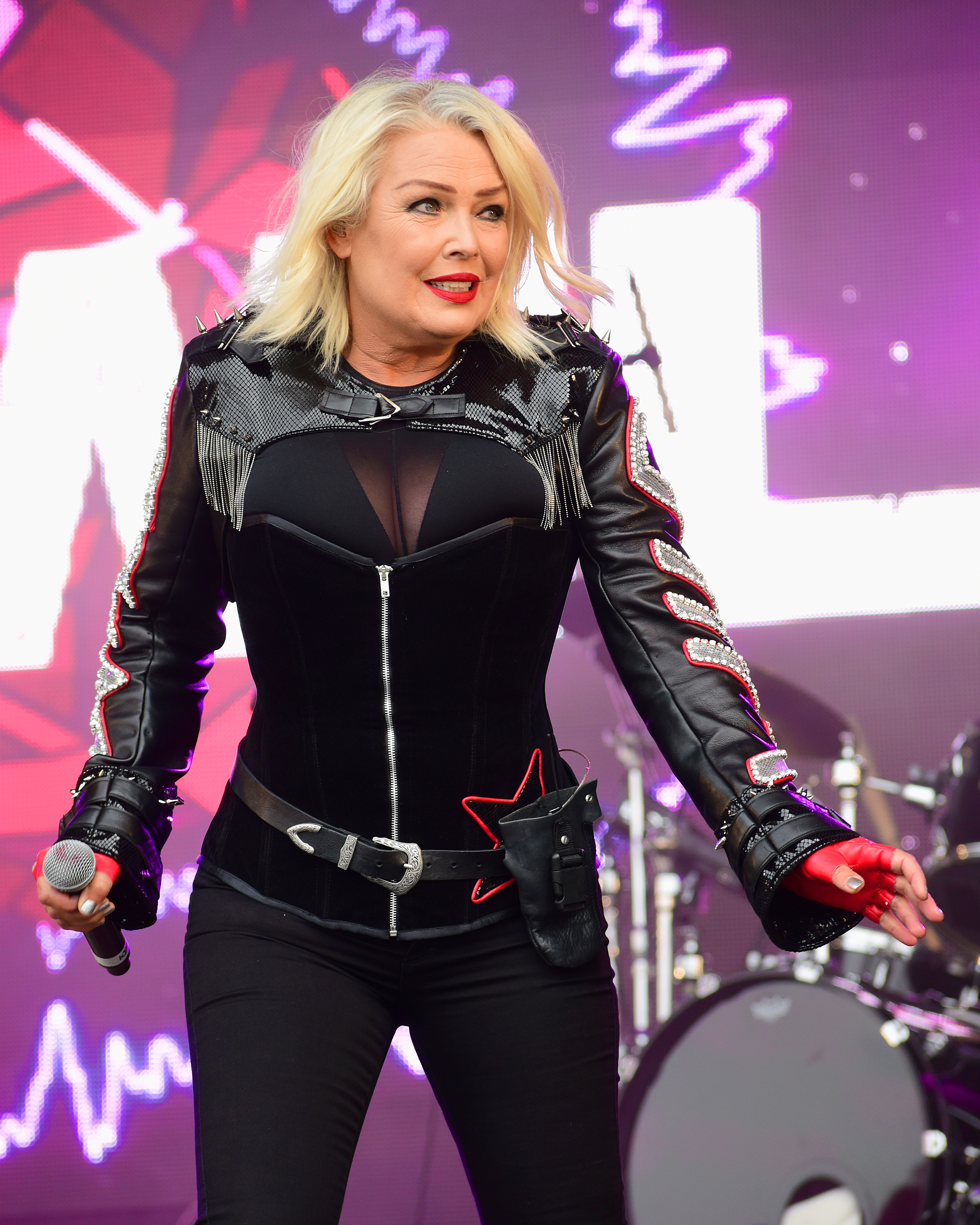
- Wilde in 2021

Background information
- Born: Kim Smith; 18 November 1960 (age 65); Chiswick, Middlesex, England
- Genres: Pop; new wave; hi-NRG
- Occupations: Singer; songwriter; radio host; DJ
- Instrument: Vocals
- Years active: 1980–present
- Labels: RAK; MCA; EMI; Columbia SevenOne
- Website: kimwilde.com
- Father: Marty Wilde
- Relatives: Ricky Wilde (brother)

Kim Wilde (born Kim Smith, 18 November 1960) is an English pop singer. She first gained success in 1981 with her debut single "Kids in America", which peaked at no. 2 in the UK. In 1983, she received the Brit Award for Best British Female solo artist. In 1986, she had a UK no. 2 hit with a reworked version of the Supremes' song "You Keep Me Hangin' On", which also topped the US Billboard Hot 100 in 1987. Between 1981 and 1996, she had 25 singles that charted within the Top 50 of the UK singles chart. Her other hits include "Chequered Love" (1981), "You Came" (1988) and "Never Trust a Stranger" (1988). In 2003, she collaborated with Nena on the song "Anyplace, Anywhere, Anytime", which topped the Dutch and Austrian charts.

She holds the record for being the most-charted British female solo act of the 1980s, with seventeen UK Top 40 hit singles. Starting in 1998, while still active in music, she has branched into an alternative career as a landscape gardener, which has included presenting gardening shows on the BBC and Channel 4. In 2005, she won a Gold award for her courtyard garden at the Royal Horticultural Society's Chelsea Flower Show.

== Early life ==
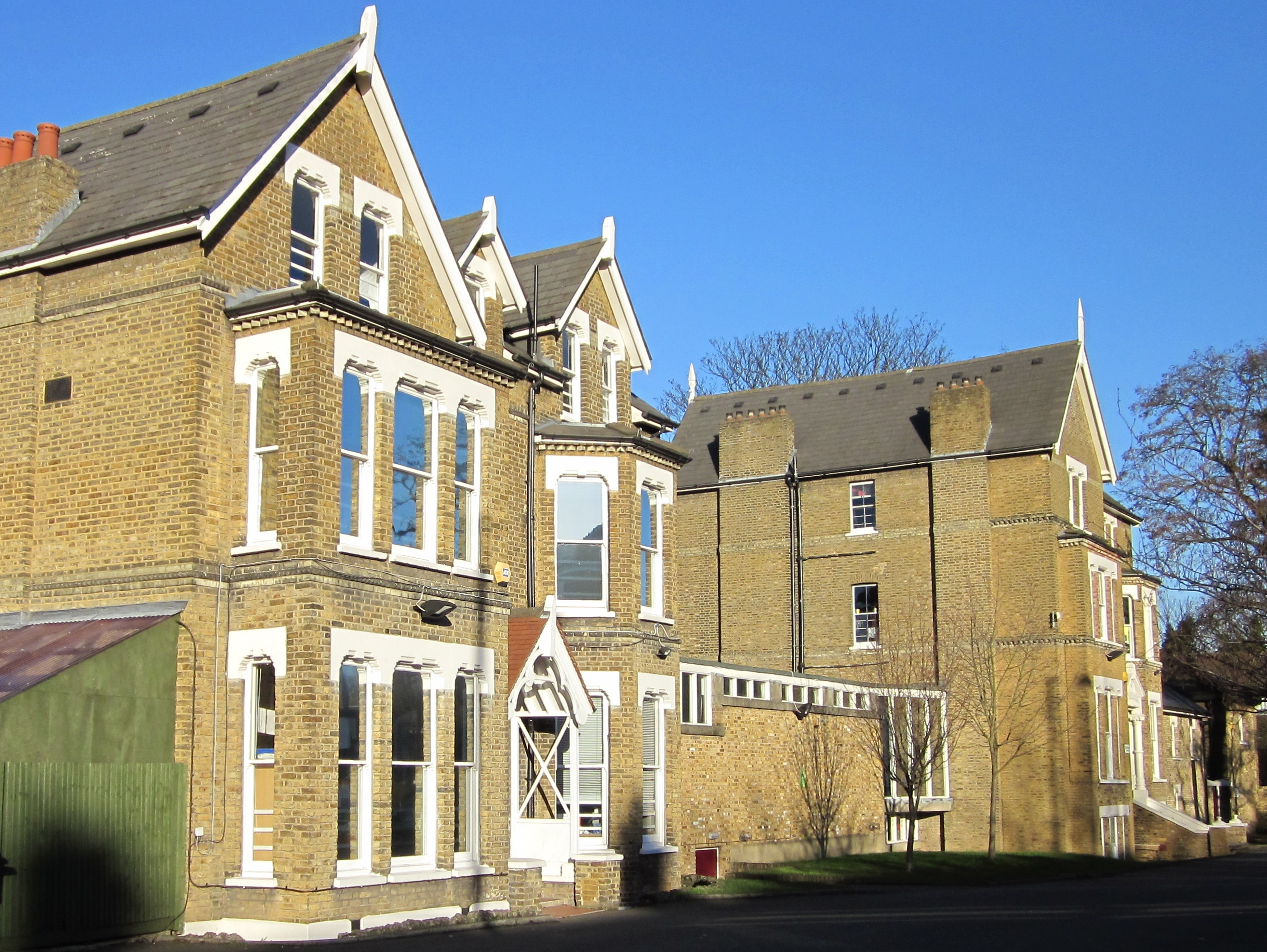
Oakfield Preparatory School in Dulwich

Wilde was born as Kim Smith in the West London suburb of Chiswick, the eldest child of 1950s rock and roller Marty Wilde (birth name Reginald Smith) and Joyce Baker, who had been a member of the singing and dancing group the Vernons Girls. She attended Oakfield Preparatory School, in the Southeast London area of Dulwich. When she was nine, the family moved to Hertfordshire, where she was educated at Tewin and later Presdales School. In 1980, at age 19, she completed a foundation course at St Albans College of Art & Design. As Kim Wilde, she was signed to RAK Records by Mickie Most.

== Music career ==
Wilde's first professional singing credit was as a backing singer to her brother Ricky's 1972 song "I Am an Astronaut."

=== RAK years ===
Wilde's father, Marty, and brother, Ricky, were responsible for writing virtually all of her material in the early-to-mid 1980s. Marty brought a classic pop sensibility to the songwriting process; Ricky's influences included the synth-pop acts OMD, Gary Numan, Ultravox and John Foxx, as well as the punk rock bands Skids and the Stranglers. Wilde released her debut single "Kids in America" in January 1981. An instant success, it reached no. 2 in the UK Singles Chart and scaled the top five in Germany, France and Australia. Although it achieved only moderate success in the US, peaking at no. 25 when released in 1982, it is often regarded today as Wilde's signature song. Her debut studio album Kim Wilde (1981) repeated the success of the single, spawning two further hits in "Chequered Love" (Top 5 in the UK, France, Australia and Germany) and the UK-only single "Water on Glass" (UK No. 11).

Wilde's follow-up album was 1982's Select, led by the hit singles "Cambodia" and "View from a Bridge". Both were no. 1 hits in France and reached the top ten in Germany and Australia. At the time, there was some controversy about Wilde's hesitation to do live concerts. Her first concerts in September 1982 took place in Denmark, before embarking on a UK-wide tour in October. Wilde's third studio album, Catch as Catch Can (1983) was a relative commercial failure. The first single from the album, "Love Blonde", was another success in France and Scandinavia, but failed to have major success in other countries. The failure of the album led to her leaving RAK and signing with MCA Records in the summer of 1984.

=== MCA years ===
Wilde's first album for MCA Teases & Dares (1984) was again overlooked in her home country, but fared better in Germany, France and Scandinavia as well as scoring another German Top 10 single with "The Second Time" (which was Top 30 in the UK). The video for this song appeared in an episode of the 1980s TV hit Knight Rider in 1985. The second single, "The Touch", was not a commercial success, but the third single, the rockabilly "Rage to Love" (the video for which features a cameo appearance by Justin Hayward, guitarist and frontman of the Moody Blues) made the UK top 20 in 1985. On Teases & Dares, Wilde made her first songwriting contributions, penning two songs. Meanwhile, she had embarked on three European concert tours (1983, 1985 and 1986).

On her fifth studio album, 1986's Another Step, Wilde wrote or co-wrote most of the songs. The album's lead single "Schoolgirl" flopped in Europe and Australia, but Wilde's fortunes improved in spectacular fashion with the album's second single, a Hi-NRG remake of the Supremes classic "You Keep Me Hangin' On". After topping the charts in Australia and Canada and peaking at No. 2 in the UK, it became a US No. 1 single in 1987. With that hit, she became the fifth UK female solo artist ever to top the US Hot 100, following Petula Clark, Lulu, Sheena Easton, and Bonnie Tyler. Her popularity, especially in her native UK, was revitalised and she scored further Top 10 hits in 1987 with "Another Step (Closer to You)" (recorded with Junior) and "Rockin' Around the Christmas Tree" (a Comic Relief charity single, recorded with comedian Mel Smith).

In 1988, Wilde released her biggest selling album to date, Close, which returned her to the UK top 10 and spent almost eight months on the UK album chart. It produced four major European hits: "Hey Mister Heartache", "You Came", "Never Trust a Stranger" and "Four Letter Word" (the last 3 were Top 10 hits in the UK). The release of the album coincided with a tour of Europe, where she was the opening act for Michael Jackson's Bad World Tour. Wilde released her next studio album, Love Moves, in 1990. The album barely made the UK Top 40, and, although it was a Top 10 success in Scandinavian countries, it failed to sell as well as its predecessor and only spawned two minor hits, "It's Here," a Top 20 success in Middle and Northern Europe as well as "Can't Get Enough (Of Your Love)", her last Top 20 hit in France. She toured Europe again as the opening act for David Bowie.

A collaboration with Rick Nowels, who had produced hits for Stevie Nicks and Belinda Carlisle, resulted in the guitar-driven pop of the single "Love Is Holy" and the album Love Is (1992). The album's success was again limited to a small number of countries, though the single became another Top 20 hit in the UK, and the second single ("Heart over Mind") also made the Top 40. In 1993, she released her first official compilation album The Singles Collection 1981–1993, which was a success throughout Europe and Australia and the dancefloor-influenced single "If I Can't Have You" (a cover of the Yvonne Elliman song from the film Saturday Night Fever that was penned by the Bee Gees), became her last UK Top 20 Hit as well as a No. 3 hit in Australia.

Wilde embarked on a huge "Greatest Hits" concert tour through Europe in 1994 and also toured Australia and Japan for the first time in six years. Her next studio album, Now & Forever (1995), was a commercial failure worldwide. Her single "Breakin' Away", however, was a minor hit, and the follow-up, "This I Swear", was also a minor hit in Europe. She released the single "Shame" in 1996, an Evelyn "Champagne" King cover. From February 1996 to February 1997, Wilde appeared in London's West End production of the rock musical, Tommy.

=== Return to pop ===
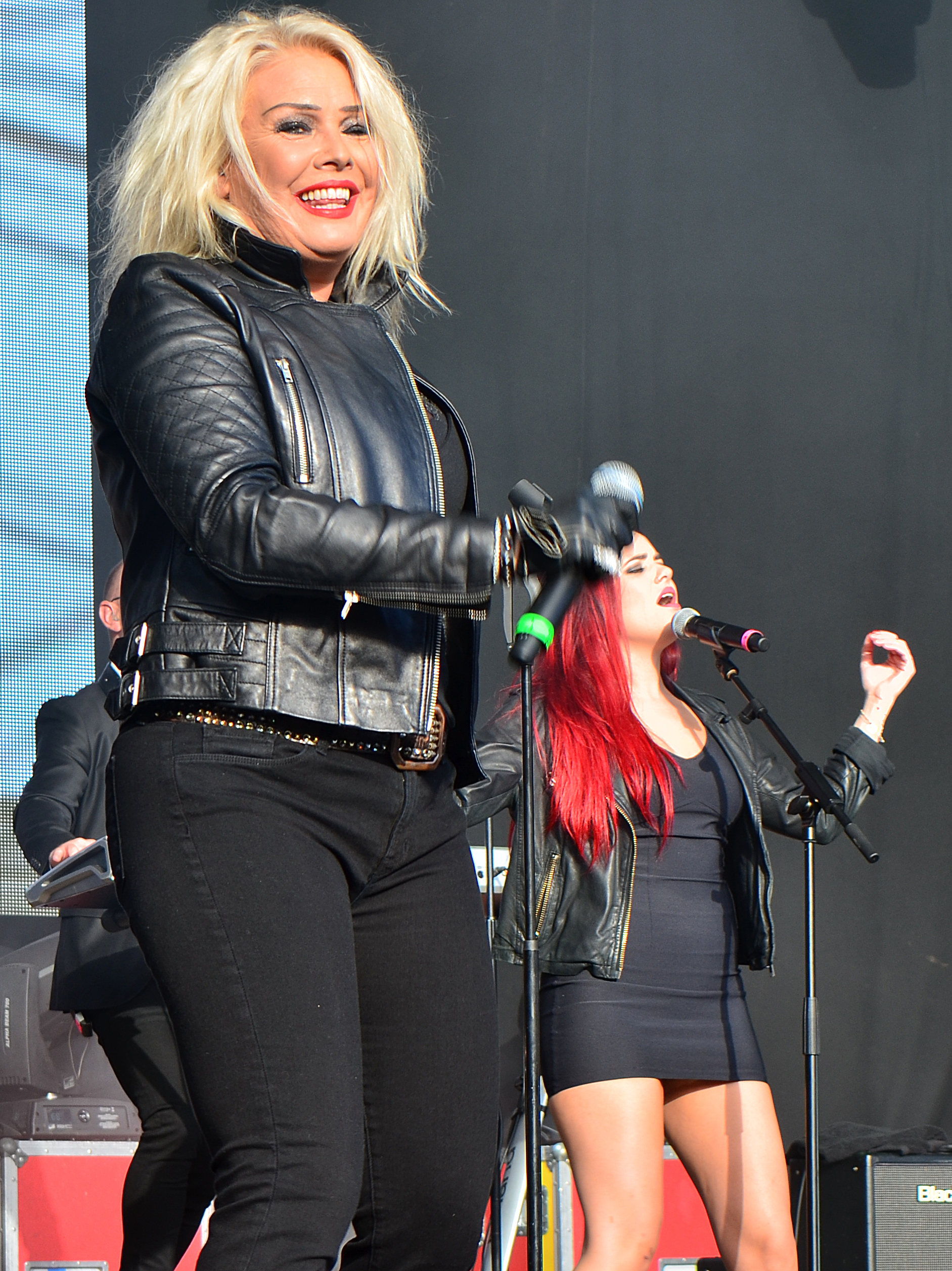
Wilde performing live at Let's Rock Bristol in 2014

Since November 2001, Wilde has toured the UK three times (and once in Australia during 2003) as part of the Here and Now Tour, an Eighties revival concert series, together with artists such as Paul Young, the Human League, Belinda Carlisle, Howard Jones and Five Star. New recordings also followed; in 2001, she recorded a new track, "Loved", for a compilation album which became a surprise hit in Belgium. She recorded the single "Born to be Wild" in 2002, and in summer of 2003 she had a major hit with "Anyplace, Anywhere, Anytime", a duet with German pop star Nena. The single was a Top 10 hit in Germany, Belgium, Austria, Netherlands and Switzerland.

In 2006, Wilde signed a new recording contract with EMI Germany and released the first single from her tenth studio album in many countries across Europe, Scandinavia and Asia. "You Came 2006" charted Top 20 in most of these countries and became her biggest solo hit in Germany since 1988. The album Never Say Never included eight new tracks plus five re-worked previous hits and has charted in Belgium, France, Switzerland, Austria and Germany. The second single from the album, which was voted for by fans on her official website was "Perfect Girl", released in November 2006 and spent nine weeks on the German Top 100 singles chart. A third single, "Together We Belong", was released in March 2007 and a fourth single, "Baby Obey Me", was released in Germany as a remix featuring German rapper Ill Inspecta.

Since 2003, Wilde has appeared on numerous festival bills and concerts all over Europe with her own band. In early September 2009, a brand new single, "Run to You", recorded as a duet with Swedish rock band Fibes, Oh Fibes!, was released in Sweden. The song reached the Swedish Top 30.

In 2010, Wilde signed a new recording contract with Sony Music Germany. The label released her eleventh studio album, Come Out and Play on 17 August, with "Lights Down Low" preceding that as lead single. The album peaked at No. 10 in Germany and was followed by a tour in Europe in February and March 2011.

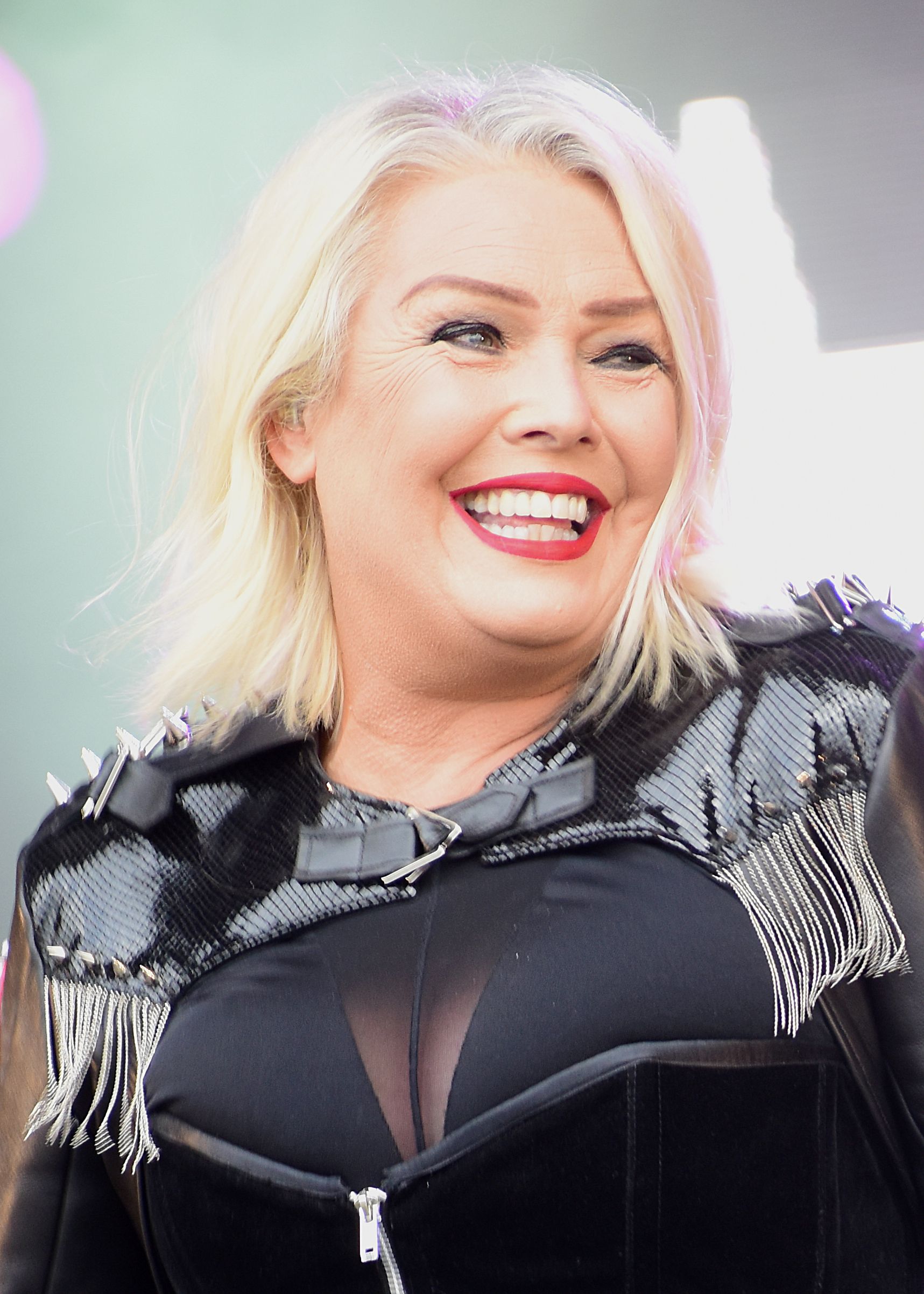
Wilde performing live at Let's Rock Liverpool, 31 July 2021

Wilde released her next studio album, Wilde Winter Songbook in November 2013. On 18 December 2017, Wilde released a Christmas single with Lawnmower Deth titled "F U Kristmas!". Wilde released her fourteenth studio album Here Come the Aliens on 16 March 2018. It was inspired by an encounter with a UFO she had in 2009. While sitting in her garden with her husband and a friend, they noticed something odd about the sky and experienced an eerie silence. They observed a huge bright light behind a cloud. Being curious she walked down the grass to track the source of the light and what she noticed was that the light was swiftly moving back and forth. She thought about it every day and it gave her the idea for her new album.

In May 2021, Wilde confirmed she would celebrate 40 years of music with the release of a box set greatest hits album titled, Pop Don't Stop: Greatest Hits. The album was released in August 2021.

== Impact and recognition ==
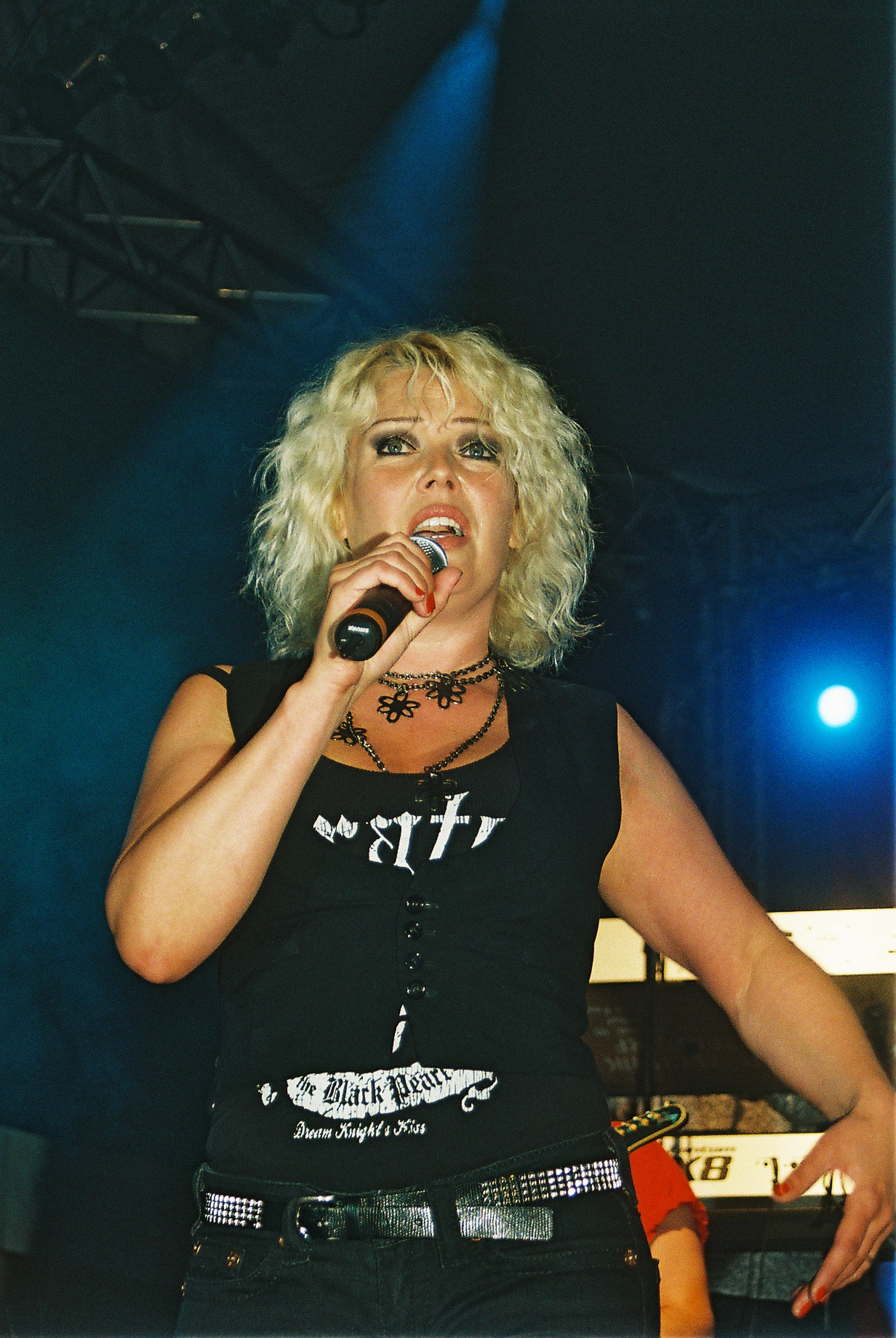
Wilde performing in 2007

Wilde holds the record for being the most-charted British female solo act of the 1980s, with seventeen UK Top 40 hit singles throughout the decade (including her duets with Junior Giscombe and Mel Smith).

A number of artists have performed covers of Kim Wilde songs, ranging from pop and rock to dance and death metal versions. On 16 February 1991, then Nirvana drummer Dave Grohl recorded a version of "Kids in America" in an Arlington County, Virginia basement studio. It is the third track on the rare 2015 "Songs from the Laundry Room" Foo Fighters EP, a clip of which plays during the credit roll of the Seattle, Washington episode of Grohl's Sonic Highways documentary TV series. American pop star Tiffany recorded a version of "Kids in America" in 2007 for her album I Think We're Alone Now: '80s Hits and More. German eurodance act Cascada, recorded a version of "Kids in America", on their Everytime We Touch album in 2007.

Wilde has provided inspiration for other artists, including Charlotte Hatherley, who wrote a song about her entitled "Kim Wilde", and included it on her debut album, Grey Will Fade. East German punk rock band Feeling B also recorded a song called "Kim Wilde", which featured on their debut album, Hea Hoa Hoa Hea Hea Hoa (1989). In 1985, French singer Laurent Voulzy paid tribute to Wilde in his song "Les Nuits Sans Kim Wilde" ("The Nights without Kim Wilde"). In her graphic novel Persepolis, Iranian cartoonist Marjane Satrapi has a comic strip titled Kim Wilde. In it the main character Marji, a young Iranian girl, sings "Kids in America" in the streets of the Iranian capital. Also, when her parents go on holiday in Turkey, they buy a poster of Wilde and smuggle it into Tehran for Marji. Marji pins the poster on her bedroom's wall and practises emulating Wilde.

== Gardening career ==
During her first pregnancy, an old interest in gardening resurfaced and she attended Capel Manor College to learn about horticulture, so as to create a garden for her children. As a celebrity, she was asked by Channel 4 to act as a designer for their programme Better Gardens. A year later, she started a two-year commitment with the BBC, recording two series of Garden Invaders.

In 2001, she (along with fellow horticulturist David Fountain) created the "All About Alice" garden for the Tatton Flower Show and was awarded the 'Best Show Garden' award. In 2005, she won a Gold award for her courtyard garden at the Royal Horticultural Society's Chelsea Flower Show. She has designed and created numerous gardens during her involvement in the Better Gardens and Garden Invaders TV programmes and commissioned by individuals and organisations. She has also created gardens for flower shows across the UK. In 2001 she was involved in setting a world record for the largest tree transplantation, when a 18 metres (58 ft) London plane was moved from Belgium to a development site in Warrington. After standing in its new location for six years, however, the tree was toppled by Cyclone Kyrill in January 2007.

=== Publications ===
Wilde has written two books as part of her gardening career. The first, Gardening with Children, was released on 4 April 2005 by Collins publishers. Her second book, The First-Time Gardener, was released on 3 April 2006 (again by Collins), and is a beginner's guide to gardening.

== TV and radio ==
Wilde broadened her eco-friendly image by taking on advertising jobs for various 'green' companies. For two years, she featured on advertisements for the highstreet health food shop Holland & Barrett. She wrote infomercials for Bold and Timotei, and in 2008, she started advertising 'green kitchens' for Magnet. In 2019, Cadbury featured Wilde in one of their 30 second TV commercials for their Darkmilk chocolate bar campaign, set in a horticultural setting.

=== Radio ===
Wilde presented Secret Songs on Magic 105.4 every Sunday between 10 am and 1 pm. It later became The Request Show. In 2021, Wilde joined Ireland's Classic Hits Radio, presenting The Kim Wilde 80's Show which airs in the evenings, four days a week.

== Personal life ==
Wilde dated Calvin Hayes, a British musician and founding member of Johnny Hates Jazz, during the 1980s. Hayes played drums for Wilde's 1981 touring band following the success of her "Kids In America" single. Calvin Hayes later recruited Wilde to sing back-up vocals for Johnny Hates Jazz's 1987 single, "Turn Back the Clock".

On 1 September 1996, Wilde married her co-star in Tommy, Hal Fowler, and expressed a desire to have children as soon as possible. On 3 January 1998 she gave birth to Harry Tristan, who is now a guitarist in the alternative rock band Wunderhorse. A daughter was born in 2000. Wilde and Fowler announced their separation and subsequent divorce via a statement on Twitter on 21 December 2022.

== Discography ==
=== Studio albums ===
- Kim Wilde (1981)
- Select (1982)
- Catch as Catch Can (1983)
- Teases & Dares (1984)
- Another Step (1986)
- Close (1988)
- Love Moves (1990)
- Love Is (1992)
- Now & Forever (1995)
- Never Say Never (2006)
- Come Out and Play (2010)
- Snapshots (2011)
- Wilde Winter Songbook (2013)
- Here Come the Aliens (2018)
- Closer (2025)

=== Compilations and other albums ===
- The Very Best of Kim Wilde (1984)
- The Singles Collection 1981–1993 (1993)
- The Remix Collection (1993)
- The Very Best of Kim Wilde (2001)
- The Hits Collection (2006)
- Pop Don't Stop: Greatest Hits (2021)

== Awards ==
- 1996 RSH-GOLD Female Classic of 1995 (Germany)
- 1993 Bambi Award for "The Singles Collection" (Germany)
- 1990 Diamond Award (Netherlands)
- 1988 European Platinum Award as female singer who sold the most records across Europe (she shared this award with equally successful 80s singer Sandra)
- 1984 Golden Otto Best Singer (Germany)
- 1983 Silver Otto Second Best Singer (Germany)
- 1982 Silver Otto Second Best Singer (Germany)
- 1981 Golden Otto Best Singer (Germany)
- 1981 Rockbjörnen – Best female singer (Sweden)

Billboard Music Awards

Year	Nominee / work	Award	Result	Ref.
1985	Herself	Top Pop Singles Artist – Female	Nominated	
1987	Herself	Top Pop Singles Artist	Nominated	
1987	Herself	Top Pop Album Artist – Female	Nominated	
1987	Herself	Top Dance Sales Artist	Nominated	
1987	"You Keep Me Hangin' On"	Top Pop Single	Nominated	
1987	"You Keep Me Hangin' On"	Top Hot Crossover Single	Nominated	
1987	"You Keep Me Hangin' On"	Top Dance Sales 12' Single	Nominated	

Brit Awards

Year	Nominee / work	Award	Result	Ref.
1983	Herself	British Female Solo Artist	Won	
1985	Herself	British Female Solo Artist	Nominated	
1987	Herself	British Female Solo Artist	Nominated	
1988	Herself	British Female Solo Artist	Nominated	

Classic Pop Reader Awards

Year	Nominee / work	Award	Result
2019	Herself	Artist of the Year	Nominated
2019	Herself	Live Act of the Year	Nominated
2019	"Kandy Krush"	Single of the Year	Nominated

Smash Hits Poll Winners Party

Year	Nominee / work	Award	Result
1981	Herself	Best Female Singer	Nominated
1981	Herself	Most Fanciable Female	Nominated
1982	Herself	Most Fanciable Female	Won
1982	Herself	Best Female Singer	Nominated
1983	Herself	Best Female Singer	Nominated
1983	Herself	Most Fanciable Female	Nominated
1984	Herself	Most Fanciable Female	Won
1984	Herself	Best Female Singer	Nominated
1985	Herself	Best Female Singer	Nominated
1985	Herself	Most Fanciable Female	Nominated
1986	Herself	Most Fanciable Female	Nominated
1987	Herself	Most Fanciable Female	Nominated
1987	Herself	Worst Female Singer	Nominated
1987	Herself	Best Female Solo Singer	Nominated
1988	Herself	Best Female Solo Singer	Nominated
1988	Herself	Most Fanciable Female	Nominated
1989	Herself	Most Fanciable Female	Nominated
1989	Herself	Best Female Solo Singer	Nominated

== Bibliography ==
- Gardening with Children (2005)
- The First-Time Gardener (2006)
