= Four Letter Word (Kim Wilde song) =

1988 single by Kim Wilde

Single by Kim Wilde

from the album Close
- B-side: "She Hasn't Got Time for You '88"
- Released: 21 November 1988
- Studio: Select Sound (Knebworth, England)
- Length: 4:04
- Label: MCA
- Songwriter(s): Ricki Wilde; Marty Wilde
- Producer(s): Ricki Wilde; Tony Swain

Kim Wilde singles chronology
"Never Trust a Stranger" (1988)	"Four Letter Word" (1988)	"Love in the Natural Way" (1989)

Music video
- "Four Letter Word" on YouTube

Professional ratings
Review scores
Source	Rating
Number One	5/5 stars

"Four Letter Word" is the fourth single from English pop singer Kim Wilde's sixth studio album, Close (1988). The song was issued as a single in November 1988 by MCA Records, marking Wilde's last release of a track written by her father and brother, who had written the majority of her early hits together. "Four Letter Word" became Wilde's third consecutive UK top-10 single from Close, reaching number six. It also peaked within the top 10 in Belgium, Denmark, Ireland, Luxembourg and the Netherlands. An extended version as well as a "late night" remix of "Four Letter Word" were released on the 12-inch and CD singles.

== Track listings ==
- 7-inch and Japanese mini-CD single
1. "Four Letter Word"
2. "She Hasn't Got Time for You '88"
- 12-inch single

A1. "Four Letter Word" (extended version) – 5:52
B1. "Four Letter Word" (late night mix) – 3:52
B2. "She Hasn't Got Time for You '88" – 4:36

- CD and European mini-CD single
1. "Four Letter Word" – 4:01
2. "She Hasn't Got Time for You '88" – 4:36
3. "Four Letter Word" (extended version) – 5:46

== Charts ==
=== Weekly charts ===
Chart (1988–1989)	Peak position
Australia (ARIA)	165
Austria (Ö3 Austria Top 40)	23
Belgium (Ultratop 50 Flanders)	9
Denmark (IFPI)	9
Europe (Eurochart Hot 100)	21
Ireland (IRMA)	5
Luxembourg (Radio Luxembourg)	4
Netherlands (Dutch Top 40)	8
Netherlands (Single Top 100)	9
Switzerland (Schweizer Hitparade)	18
UK Singles (OCC)	6
West Germany (GfK)	27

=== Year-end charts ===
Chart (1989)	Position
Belgium (Ultratop 50 Flanders)	74
Netherlands (Dutch Top 40)	92
Netherlands (Single Top 100)	82

== Release history ==
Region	Date	Format(s)	Label(s)	Ref.
United Kingdom	21 November 1988	7-inch vinyl; 12-inch vinyl; CD	MCA	
Japan	25 February 1989	Mini-CD	MCA	
