= Rage to Love =

Single by Kim Wilde

from the album Teases & Dares
- B-side: "Putty in Your Hands"
- Released: 15 April 1985
- Recorded: 1984
- Studio: Select Sound Studios, Knebworth
- Genre: Rockabilly
- Length: 4:21 (Album Version); 3:50 (7" Version)
- Label: MCA
- Songwriters: Ricki Wilde, Marty Wilde
- Producer: Ricki Wilde

Kim Wilde singles chronology
"The Touch" (1984)	"Rage to Love" (1985)	"Schoolgirl" (1986)

"Rage to Love" is the third and final single from Teases & Dares, the fourth studio album by the English pop singer Kim Wilde. Released in April 1985, the song was remixed by Dave Edmunds for its release as a single. It became Wilde's biggest UK hit for three years, reaching the UK Top 20. The B-side —a cover version of the Shirelles' "Putty in Your Hands"—is an exclusive non-album track. A six-minute extended version of "Rage to Love" was included on the 12" single.

== Track listing ==
Side A
"Rage to Love" (Ricki Wilde/Marty Wilde) – 3:50
Side B
"Putty in Your Hands" (J. Patton/K. Rogers) – 3:01

== Chart performance ==
Chart (1985)	Peak position
Australia (Kent Music Report)	94
Luxembourg (Radio Luxembourg)	12
UK Singles (OCC)	19
Germany (GfK)	45
Europe (Eurochart Hot 100)	28
