= Close (Kim Wilde album) =

Studio album by Kim Wilde
- Released: 13 June 1988
- Recorded: 1987–1988
- Studios: Select Sound, Knebworth, Hertfordshire
- Genres: Pop; hi-NRG; synth-pop
- Length: 51:22
- Label: MCA
- Producers: Ricky Wilde; Tony Swain

Kim Wilde chronology
Another Step (1986)	Close (1988)	Love Moves (1990)

Singles from Close
- 1. "Hey Mister Heartache" Released: 18 April 1988; 2. "You Came" Released: 4 July 1988; 3. "Never Trust a Stranger" Released: 19 September 1988; 4. "Four Letter Word" Released: 21 November 1988; 5. "Love in the Natural Way" Released: 20 February 1989 (UK, Germany only)

Professional ratings
Review scores
Source	Rating
AllMusic	3/5 stars
Number One	4/5 stars
Record Mirror	2/5 stars

Close is the sixth studio album by the English pop singer Kim Wilde, released on 13 June 1988 by MCA Records.

Produced by Ricky Wilde and Tony Swain, Close was the final album on which Marty Wilde had co-writer credits.

The album's lead single was "Hey Mister Heartache", featuring backing vocals from Junior Giscombe – but its success was dwarfed by the follow-up single, "You Came", which hit the top 10 in many countries and just missed the US top 40.

"Never Trust a Stranger" and "Four Letter Word" also reached the UK top 10, although a fifth single "Love in the Natural Way" was less successful. Attention for the album was bolstered by Wilde's support slot on Michael Jackson's European tour.

Close reached the top 10 in the UK, almost all Scandinavian countries, Austria and Germany and went on to become Wilde's biggest selling album, being certified platinum in the UK. In Australia, the album was less successful, peaking at number 82 on the ARIA albums chart.

A 2-CD 25th anniversary edition of Close was released in the United Kingdom in September 2013, with the album's original 10 tracks bolstered by an additional 21 B-sides and remixes.

== Critical response ==
Anne Lambert, noting the ups and downs of Wilde's career, concluded that Close was "proof that Kim will still be around when her rivals are fighting it out in the bargain bins." Despite expressing hope that the singer would "experiment and take some chances", the reviewer singled out both the "luscious ballad" "Four Letter Word" and the "brilliant funk" of "Hey Mister Heartache". Smash Hits gave a mixed review, expressing dislike for the tracks "Four Letter Word" and "Lucky Guy" but again describing "Hey Mister Heartache" as "brilliant" and "Love in the Natural Way" as "steamy". Caroline Sullivan of Melody Maker gave a mostly positive review but noted the similarities of the production to recent work by SAW and wrote "Many songs here could be Bananarama Wow! tracks with Kim's voice superimposed." Q, while describing Wilde as an institution in British pop (along with Bananarama), wrote that "You Came" sounded "dated" and "like an out-take from Human League's Dare". However, praise was reserved for a "really special moment"; Wilde's faithful version of Todd Rundgren's "Lucky Guy". "Writing for Sounds, Peter Kane compared the "pure pop" album unfavorably to the work of Pet Shop Boys and Belinda Carlisle, specifically citing "Four Letter Word" as "having been discarded by Sheena Easton while clearing her wardrobe of Crimplene jumpsuits."

== Track listing ==
Side one

1. "Hey Mister Heartache" (Kim Wilde, Steve Byrd) – 4:34
2. "You Came" (Kim Wilde, Ricky Wilde) – 4:33
3. "Four Letter Word" (Marty Wilde, Ricky Wilde) – 4:02
4. "Love in the Natural Way" (Kim Wilde, Marty Wilde, Ricky Wilde) – 4:07
5. "Love's a No" (Kim Wilde, Marty Wilde, Ricky Wilde) – 4:16

Side two

1. "Never Trust a Stranger" (Kim Wilde, Ricky Wilde) – 4:04
2. "You'll Be the One Who'll Lose" (Kim Wilde, Marty Wilde, Ricky Wilde) – 4:32
3. "European Soul" (Kim Wilde, Ricky Wilde) – 5:20
4. "Stone" (Kim Wilde, Marty Wilde, Ricky Wilde) – 4:41
5. "Lucky Guy" (Todd Rundgren) – 2:38
- Bonus track on CD: "Hey Mister Heartache" (12" version) – 8:06

=== Remastered expanded edition ===
Disc one
No.	Title	Length
1.	"Hey Mister Heartache"	4:37
2.	"You Came"	4:34
3.	"Four Letter Word"	4:02
4.	"Love in the Natural Way"	4:17
5.	"Love's a No"	4:16
6.	"Never Trust a Stranger"	4:05
7.	"You'll Be the One Who'll Lose"	4:32
8.	"European Soul"	5:19
9.	"Stone"	4:39
10.	"Lucky Guy"	2:39
11.	"Tell Me Where You Are"	3:11
12.	"Wotcha Gonna Do"	4:02
13.	"She Hasn't Got Time for You '88"	4:35
14.	"Hey Mister Heartache" (single version)	3:50
15.	"You Came" (single version)	3:29
16.	"Never Trust a Stranger" (single version)	4:06
17.	"Love in the Natural Way" (video edit)	3:48
18.	"You Came" (Shep Pettibone US single version)	4:13

Disc two
No.	Title	Length
1.	"Hey Mister Heartache" (12″ Version)	8:09
2.	"Hey Mister Heartache" (Kilo Watt remix)	6:05
3.	"Hey Mister Heartache" (bonus beats)	4:41
4.	"Hey Mister Heartache" (acapella with percussion)	4:44
5.	"You Came" (12″ version)	6:45
6.	"You Came" (Shep Pettibone 12″ mix)	7:34
7.	"You Came" (dub version #1)	4:54
8.	"You Came" (dub version #2)	4:47
9.	"Never Trust a Stranger" (12″ version)	5:59
10.	"Never Trust a Stranger" (Sanjazz mix)	5:46
11.	"Four Letter Word" (12″ version)	5:51
12.	"Four Letter Word" (late night mix)	3:56
13.	"Love in the Natural Way" (extended version)	5:57

- The bonus beats and a cappella with percussion versions of "Hey Mister Heartache" were previously unreleased.

== Personnel ==
- Kim Wilde – lead and backing vocals
- Ricky Wilde – keyboards, programming, guitars, backing vocals, producer
- Tony Swain – keyboards, programming, producer (1–5, 7–10)
- Bias Boshell – additional keyboards (10)
- Steve Byrd – guitars
- Junior Giscombe – backing vocals, additional vocals (1)
- Nicci Sun – backing vocals
- James Richards – engineer
- Richard Lengyel – mixing
- Michael Nash – album design
- Russell Young – photography

== Charts ==
=== Weekly charts ===
Weekly chart performance for Close
Chart (1988–1989)	Peak position
Australian Albums (Australian Music Report)	82
Austrian Albums (Ö3 Austria)	7
Dutch Albums (Album Top 100)	8
European Albums (Music & Media)	16
Finnish Albums (Suomen virallinen lista)	11
German Albums (Offizielle Top 100)	10
Icelandic Albums (Tónlist)	6
Italian Albums (FIMI)	20
Norwegian Albums (VG-lista)	6
Swedish Albums (Sverigetopplistan)	11
Swiss Albums (Schweizer Hitparade)	8
UK Albums (Official Charts)	8
US Billboard 200	114

Weekly chart performance for Close: Deluxe Edition
Chart (2026)	Peak position
Belgian Albums (Ultratop Wallonia)	192
Scottish Albums (Official Charts)	28
UK Independent Albums (Official Charts)	20
UK Album Sales Chart(OCC)	20

=== Year-end charts ===
Year-end chart performance for Close
Chart (1988)	Position
Dutch Albums (Album Top 100)	69
European Albums (Music & Media)	43
German Albums (Offizielle Top 100)	39
Swiss Albums (Schweizer Hitparade)	15

== Certifications and sales ==
Certifications and sales for Close
Region	Certification	Certified units/sales
Austria (IFPI Austria)	Gold	25,000
France (SNEP)	Gold	100,000^{*}
Germany (BVMI)	Gold	250,000^{^}
Netherlands (NVPI)	Gold	50,000^{^}
Sweden (GLF)	Gold	50,000^{^}
Switzerland (IFPI Switzerland)	Platinum	50,000^{^}
United Kingdom (BPI)	Platinum	300,000^{^}
Summaries
Europe	—	1,200,000
^{*} Sales figures based on certification alone.^{^} Shipments figures based on certification alone.
