= Kids in America =

1981 single by Kim Wilde

- European picture sleeve

Single by Kim Wilde

from the album Kim Wilde
- B-side: "Tuning In, Tuning On" (UK); "You'll Never Be So Wrong" (North America)
- Released: 26 January 1981
- Recorded: 1980
- Studio: RAK, London
- Genre: Synth-pop; new wave; pop rock; power pop
- Length: 3:27
- Label: RAK (UK) EMI (US)
- Songwriters: Marty Wilde; Ricky Wilde
- Producer: Ricky Wilde

Kim Wilde singles chronology
"Kids in America" (1981)	"Chequered Love" (1981)

Audio sample
- file; help

"Kids in America 1994"

Single by Kim Wilde
- Released: 2 May 1994
- Length: 3:53 (Cappella Mix)
- Label: MCA
- Songwriters: Ricky Wilde; Marty Wilde
- Producer: Ricky Wilde

Kim Wilde singles chronology
"In My Life" (1993)	"Kids in America 1994" (1994)	"Breakin' Away" (1995)

"Kids in America" is a song recorded by the English pop singer Kim Wilde. It was released in the United Kingdom as her debut single in January 1981, and in the United States in spring 1982, later appearing on her debut album, Kim Wilde. Largely inspired by the synth-pop style of Orchestral Manoeuvres in the Dark (OMD) and Gary Numan, the song reached number two on the UK Singles Chart for two weeks and number one in Finland and South Africa, and charted in the top 10 of many European charts as well as Australia and New Zealand. In North America, it became her first top 40 hit, reaching the top 40 in Canada and the United States. It was certified gold in the United Kingdom, South Africa, Australia and Sweden; and has sold over three million copies worldwide. The song has been covered by many artists from different genres.

== Background, composition and production ==
=== 1980 version ===
RAK Records boss Mickie Most heard Wilde singing on a backing track to a song recorded by her brother Ricky Wilde, an aspiring young songwriter and producer who had some fame as a child singer in the style of Donny Osmond in the early 1970s. Most liked Wilde's voice and looks and expressed an interest in working with her. Ricky wrote "Kids in America" that same day with his father Marty Wilde using a WASP synthesizer. The main synth line was influenced by OMD's "Messages". Wilde has stated that her brother "kind of nicked" the line. The eighth note synth bassline, which forms the intro, was inspired by Gary Numan (as was the vocal melody in the opening lines).

They went into the studio with everything except the words to the chorus, which Marty Wilde, who was responsible for writing the lyrics to the song, came up with at the last minute. Marty had recently seen a television programme featuring American teenagers and took inspiration from their single-minded and hard attitudes, leading him to the song's story of a tough girl looking out of the window and thinking, "What the damn hell am I doing sitting here."

The line "Whoah-oh!", which is sung after the song's title lyrics, was originally meant to be a guitar lick or a brass stab, but sounded much better sung by the male backing vocals, according to Marty.

After hearing the track for the first time, Most declared it would be a smash hit; but it needed remixing, which he did together with Marty at RAK Studios. The song was shelved for a year before being released as Kim Wilde's first single in January 1981.

=== 1994 version ===
"Kids in America 1994" was released in May 1994 in order to help promote Wilde's compilation album The Remix Collection (1993). Although it was intended to be released in the UK, for unknown reasons these plans were cancelled at the last minute. However, the track was released in other countries in several remixed forms using Wilde's original vocals from 1981.

=== 2006 version ===
Among some of her other classic hits, Wilde recorded a new version of the song for her 2006 comeback album Never Say Never, featuring English singer Charlotte Hatherley. This version, like the rest of the album, was produced by German producer Uwe Fahrenkrog-Petersen, with whom she had previously worked in 2002 for German singer Nena's 20th-anniversary album Nena feat. Nena on the track "Anyplace, Anywhere, Anytime", a new version of her 1984 hit single.

=== Music video ===
The music video is directed by Nigel Dick and it was located in Los Angeles, California. No Secrets is dancing in the room full of stars with a star-shaped stage in the middle where the spotlights are shining through it. A crowd of people who are dancing with the group on the stage and dancing with them others.

== Reception ==
"Kids in America" signalled the start of Wilde's career. It sold so well in its first week, foul play was suspected and it was not included in that week's chart. In its first eight weeks of release, the single sold more than half a million copies in the UK alone. The song peaked at number two in the UK in 1981 and became the 23rd-best-selling single that year. The following year in 1982, it reached No. 25 on the US Billboard Hot 100 for over a month and ranked as the 91st-most-successful song of 1982 on the Hot 100 year-end chart. Though it only hit No. 25, it received heavy airplay on radio stations and MTV. Elsewhere, the record peaked atop the charts of Finland and South Africa. In Europe and Australia, the song was also a major top-10 hit. After "Kids in America", Wilde's father and brother continued to write songs for her (with the latter also given production credits). In later years, she chiefly co-wrote with her brother.

== Track listing ==
UK / Europe / Australia / Japan 7" single [1981]

1. "Kids in America" – 3:26
2. "Tuning In, Tuning On" [Single Version] – 4:30

Germany 12" single [1981]

1. "Kids in America" – 3:26
2. "Tuning In, Tuning On" [Single Version] – 4:30

US/Canada 7" single [1982]

1. "Kids in America" – 3:26
2. "You'll Never Be So Wrong" – 4:11

Europe CD single / Australia cassette single [1994]

1. "Kids in America 94" [Cappella Mix] – 3:54
2. "Kids in America 94" [Extension Mix] – 6:52

Europe CD single / Australia CD single [1994]

1. "Kids in America 94" [Cappella Mix] – 3:54
2. "Kids in America 94" [Extension Mix] – 6:56
3. "Kids in America" [Album Version] – 3:24

Europe 12" single [1994]

1. "Kids in America 94" [Extension Mix] – 6:49
2. "Kids in America 94" [House Mix] – 6:49
3. "Kids in America 94" [Plus Staples] – 5:10

Japan CD single [1994]

1. "Kids in America 94" [Cappella Mix] – 3:51
2. "Kids in America 94" [Extension Mix] – 6:52
3. "Kids in America 94" [House Mix] – 6:52
4. "Kids in America 94" [Plus Staples] – 5:09

UK promo 12" single [1994]

1. "Kids in America 94" [Extension Mix] – 6:49
2. "Kids in America 94" [X Club Dub] – 6:00
3. "Kids in America 94" [Instrumental] – 6:49
4. "Kids in America 94" [House Mix] – 6:49
5. "Kids in America 94" [Plus Staples] 5:09
6. "Kids in America 94" [X Cut Cut] – 5:35

== Charts ==
=== Weekly charts ===
Chart (1981–1983)	Peak position
Australia (Kent Music Report)	5
Austria (Ö3 Austria Top 40)	12
Belgium (Ultratop 50 Flanders)	4
Canada Top Singles (RPM)	34
Finland (Suomen virallinen lista)	1
Ireland (IRMA)	2
Luxembourg (Radio Luxembourg)	2
Netherlands (Dutch Top 40)	6
Netherlands (Single Top 100)	8
New Zealand (Recorded Music NZ)	5
Norway (VG-lista)	9
South Africa (Springbok Radio)	1
Sweden (Sverigetopplistan)	2
Switzerland (Schweizer Hitparade)	5
UK Singles (Official Charts)	2
US Billboard Hot 100	25
US Mainstream Rock (Billboard)	29
US Cash Box Top 100	20
West Germany (GfK)	5
Zimbabwe (ZIMA)	1

=== Year-end charts ===
Chart (1981)	Position
Australia (Kent Music Report)	10
Belgium (Ultratop 50 Flanders)	14
Netherlands (Dutch Top 40)	29
Netherlands (Single Top 100)	37
New Zealand (RIANZ)	37
South Africa (Springbok Radio)	15
Switzerland (Schweizer Hitparade)	18
UK Singles (OCC)	23
West Germany (Media Control)	3

Chart (1982)	Position
US Billboard Hot 100	91

== Certifications ==
Region	Certification	Certified units/sales
Australia (ARIA)	Gold	50,000^{^}
France (SNEP)	Gold	600,000
New Zealand (RMNZ)	Gold	15,000^{‡}
South Africa (RISA)	Gold	
Sweden (GLF)	Gold	
United Kingdom (BPI) 1981 release	Gold	500,000^{^}
United Kingdom (BPI) 2004 release	Platinum	600,000^{‡}
Summaries
Worldwide	—	3,000,000
^{^} Shipments figures based on certification alone.^{‡} Sales+streaming figures based on certification alone.

== Cover Versions ==
- Lawnmower Deth covered the song in 1991. Kim Wilde would later perform with the band on their 2017 song F U Kristmas!
- Bloodhound Gang featured the song on their debut album in 1995.
- First recorded in 1994, American punk rock band Fourth Grade Nothing contributed a cover of the song to the soundtrack for the 1996 film Bio-Dome.
- The Muffs contributed a cover of the song to the soundtrack for the 1995 film Clueless.
- Len contributed a cover of the song to the soundtrack for the 2000 film Digimon: The Movie.
- American girl group No Secrets covered the song, releasing it as the first single from their self-titled debut album and from the Jimmy Neutron: Boy Genius movie soundtrack.
- Foo Fighters covered the song on their EP Songs from the Laundry Room (2015). A clip of it plays during the credit roll of the Seattle, Washington episode of Grohl's Sonic Highways documentary TV series. In 2021, Wilde admitted to being a huge fan of the recording and said she'd love to collaborate with frontman Dave Grohl on a new version of the track.
- Billie Joe Armstrong of Green Day included a cover of the song on his cover album No Fun Mondays (2020).
- The Jonas Brothers recorded a reworked adaptation of the song, retitled "Kids of the Future", for the soundtrack of the 2007 Disney animated film Meet the Robinsons; the version replaces the original lyrics with references to the film's plot and was later included on the band's self-titled album.
- Sleater-Kinney performed the song on the Netflix talk show Everybody's Live with John Mulaney in 2026, with comedian-musician Fred Armisen performing drums.
- The Donnas covered the song for the 2007 Nancy Drew movie soundtrack.
