= It's Here =

1990 single by Kim Wilde

Single by Kim Wilde

from the album Love Moves
- B-side: "Virtual World"
- Released: 2 April 1990
- Genre: Electropop
- Length: 3:36 (album version); 3:31 (7-inch version); 6:28 (Extended version)
- Label: MCA
- Songwriters: Kim Wilde; Ricki Wilde
- Producer: Ricki Wilde

Kim Wilde singles chronology
"Love in the Natural Way" (1989)	"It's Here" (1990)	"Time" (1990)

Music video
- "It's Here" on YouTube

"It's Here" is a song by English singer-songwriter Kim Wilde, released as the first single from her seventh album, Love Moves (1990), and is also her first release of the new decade. "It's Here" became a moderate hit in some countries. Both the single and its B-side, "Virtual World" (an exclusive non-album track) were extended for the 12-inch and CD formats.

== Critical reception ==
Bob Stanley from Melody Maker commented, "It's here! It's Kim! It's springy and sounds a little like Kirsty MacColl with a lively electro backing and a smart bit of Spanish guitar midway through! It's surprisingly listenable!" A reviewer from Music & Media said, "The perfect combination. A mellow, melancholic tune, a committed vocal delivery and a good dance groove rapped up in a slick production." David Giles from Music Week wrote, "Wilde takes a leaf out of the Sydney Youngblood book, blending a splash of flamenco guitar against a bold dance rhythm. Considerably stronger than her other recent singles with a powerful chorus and an expansive production job." Stuart Maconie from NME said, "Some nice synthesiser tinkles appealed to my frankly mid-'80s sensibilities. Some strangulated vocal effects, however, suggests that Kim may want to be regarded as a serious artist in her own right."

== Charts ==
=== Weekly charts ===
Chart (1990)	Peak position
Australia (ARIA)	104
Belgium (Ultratop 50 Flanders)	32
Europe (Eurochart Hot 100)	48
Finland (Suomen virallinen lista)	4
Italy (Musica e dischi)	27
Italy Airplay (Music & Media)	6
Netherlands (Dutch Top 40 Tipparade)	5
Netherlands (Single Top 100)	39
Norway (VG-lista)	6
Sweden (Sverigetopplistan)	13
Switzerland (Schweizer Hitparade)	14
UK Singles (OCC)	42
West Germany (GfK)	21

=== Year-end charts ===
Chart (1990)	Position
Germany (Media Control)	97
Sweden (Topplistan)	82

== Release history ==
Region	Date	Format(s)	Label(s)	Ref(s).
United Kingdom	2 April 1990	7-inch vinyl; 12-inch vinyl; CD; cassette	MCA	
Australia	4 June 1990	7-inch vinyl; 12-inch vinyl; CD; cassette	MCA	
Japan	10 July 1990	Mini-CD	MCA	
