= You Came =

1988 single by Kim Wilde

Single by Kim Wilde

from the album Close
- B-side: "Stone"; "Tell Me Where You Are"
- Released: 4 July 1988
- Genre: Dance-pop
- Length: 4:34 (album version); 3:29 (7-inch version)
- Label: MCA
- Songwriters: Ricky Wilde; Kim Wilde
- Producers: Ricky Wilde; Tony Swain

Kim Wilde singles chronology
"Hey Mister Heartache" (1988)	"You Came" (1988)	"Never Trust a Stranger" (1988)

Music video
- "You Came" on YouTube

"You Came" is a song by the English singer Kim Wilde from her sixth studio album, Close (1988). It was released on 4 July 1988 by MCA Records as the album's second single. The song was written by Wilde and her brother Ricky Wilde, after the birth of his first child, Marty (named after their father) and produced by him with Tony Swain.

"You Came" became one of the most successful singles of Wilde's career, peaking at number three on the UK Singles Chart and reaching the top 10 in several other European countries, including Denmark, where it reached number one for five weeks. In the United States, it was her fourth (and, as of 2026, final) single to reach the top 50, peaking at number 41 on the Billboard Hot 100.

== Remixes and B-sides ==
The version of the song used for the 7-inch single in Europe and Australia was an edited version of the original found on the Close album. An extended version was also released on the 12-inch and CD single format. In North America, a remix by Shep Pettibone was included on both formats, with an edited version on the 7-inch and two different dub versions (only available on the 12-inch format). The full length Pettibone remix was also released on a separate 12-inch single in Europe.

In the countries where "You Came" was the first Close single (namely North America and France), the B-side used was an exclusive non-album track called "Tell Me Where You Are", which in the rest of the world had been the B-side to the first Close single "Hey Mister Heartache". In these countries the B-side to "You Came" was a track from the album entitled "Stone". In Japan, an extended play (EP) containing extended versions of all five singles from Close was released under the title "You Came" in June 1989.

== Track listings ==
- UK and Australian 7-inch single

A. "You Came"
B. "Stone"

- UK mini-CD and 12-inch single
1. "You Came" – 6:44
2. "You Came" (7-inch version) – 3:29
3. "Stone" – 4:41
- UK 12-inch single – Shep Pettibone mix

A. "You Came" (Shep Pettibone mix)
B. "You Came"

- US and Canadian 7-inch single, US cassette single

A. "You Came" – 4:02
B. "Tell Me Where You Are" – 3:11

- US and Canadian 12-inch single

A. "You Came" (the Shep Pettibone mix) – 7:35
B1. "You Came" (dub version 1) – 4:52
B2. "You Came" (dub version 2) – 4:52

== Charts ==
=== Weekly charts ===
Weekly chart performance for "You Came"
Chart (1988–1989)	Peak position
Australia (ARIA)	34
Austria (Ö3 Austria Top 40)	8
Belgium (Ultratop 50 Flanders)	10
Canada Top Singles (RPM)	94
Canada Dance/Urban (RPM)	1
Denmark (Tracklisten)	1
Europe (Eurochart Hot 100 Singles)	2
Finland (Suomen virallinen lista)	2
France (SNEP)	5
Ireland (IRMA)	3
Italy (Musica e dischi)	3
Italy Airplay (Music & Media)	9
Luxembourg (Radio Luxembourg)	3
Netherlands (Dutch Top 40)	13
Netherlands (Single Top 100)	11
Norway (VG-lista)	4
Portugal (AFP)	3
Sweden (Sverigetopplistan)	7
Switzerland (Schweizer Hitparade)	3
UK Singles (Official Charts)	3
US Billboard Hot 100	41
US 12-inch Singles Sales (Billboard)	21
US Dance Club Play (Billboard)	10
US Cash Box Top 100	41
West Germany (GfK)	5

=== Year-end charts ===
Year-end chart performance for "You Came"
Chart (1988)	Position
Belgium (Ultratop 50 Flanders)	75
Canada Dance/Urban (RPM)	6
Europe (Eurochart Hot 100 Singles)	10
Europe (European Airplay Top 50)	7
Netherlands (Single Top 100)	84
Switzerland (Schweizer Hitparade)	21
UK Singles (Gallup)	37
West Germany (Media Control)	30

== Certifications ==
Certifications and sales for "You Came"
Region	Certification	Certified units/sales
France (SNEP)	Gold	
United Kingdom (BPI)	Silver	250,000^{^}
^{^} Shipments figures based on certification alone.

== Release history ==
Release dates and formats for "You Came"
Region	Date	Format(s)	Label(s)	Ref(s).
United Kingdom	4 July 1988	7-inch vinyl; mini-CD	MCA	
United Kingdom	18 July 1988	12-inch vinyl	MCA	
Japan	10 September 1988	Mini-CD	MCA	
Japan	25 June 1989	CD EP; cassette EP	MCA	

== 2006 version ==
"You Came (2006)"

Single by Kim Wilde

from the album Never Say Never
- B-side: "Maybe I'm Crazy"
- Released: 18 August 2006
- Length: 3:10
- Label: EMI
- Songwriters: Ricky Wilde; Kim Wilde
- Producer: Jörn-Uwe Fahrenkrog-Petersen

Kim Wilde singles chronology
"Anyplace, Anywhere, Anytime" (2003)	"You Came (2006)" (2006)	"Perfect Girl" (2006)

Music video
- "You Came" "You Came" (Alternative Videoclip Version – In Bed With Kim Wilde) on YouTube

In 2006, Wilde re-recorded "You Came", retitled "You Came (2006)", for her tenth studio album, Never Say Never (2006). The re-working was released on 18 August 2006 by EMI Records as the album's lead single, reaching the top 30 in several European countries. It was produced by Jörn-Uwe Fahrenkrog-Petersen.

=== Track listings ===
- CD single
1. "You Came (2006)"
2. "Maybe I'm Crazy"
- CD maxi single
1. "You Came (2006)"
2. "Maybe I'm Crazy"
3. "You Came (2006)" (Groovenut remix)
4. "You Came (2006)" (Old School mix)

=== Charts ===
==== Weekly charts ====
Weekly chart performance for "You Came (2006)"
Chart (2006)	Peak position
Austria (Ö3 Austria Top 40)	24
Belgium (Ultratop 50 Flanders)	33
Germany (GfK)	20
Hungary (Rádiós Top 40)	26
Italy (FIMI)	36
Netherlands (Dutch Top 40)	26
Netherlands (Single Top 100)	30
Sweden (Sverigetopplistan)	25
Switzerland (Schweizer Hitparade)	19

==== Year-end charts ====
Year-end chart ranking for "You Came (2006)"
Chart (2006)	Position
Netherlands (Dutch Top 40)	169

== Cover versions ==
"You Came" has been covered several times and in several different languages. A Greek version entitled "Eisai oti agapo" (You are all that I love) was released by Bessy Argyraki, a Finnish version entitled "Niin tein" was released by the band Hausmylly, and the original English version has been covered by German band Aura, Estonian singer Hylene, the B. City Crew, Baz, and Candy Warhol.
