= Never Trust a Stranger =

1988 single by Kim Wilde

Single by Kim Wilde

from the album Close
- B-side: "Wotcha Gonna Do"
- Released: 19 September 1988
- Genre: Hi-NRG
- Length: 4:05
- Label: MCA
- Songwriters: Kim Wilde; Ricki Wilde
- Producer: Ricki Wilde

Kim Wilde singles chronology
"You Came" (1988)	"Never Trust a Stranger" (1988)	"Four Letter Word" (1988)

Music video
- "Never Trust a Stranger" on YouTube

"Never Trust a Stranger" is a song by English singer-songwriter Kim Wilde, released as the third single from her sixth album, Close (1988). Remixed from the original album track by her brother, producer Ricki Wilde, it was released in September 1988 by MCA Records following several European tour dates supporting Michael Jackson. It became another big hit for Wilde in Europe, peaking within the top 10 in Austria, Belgium, Denmark, Ireland, Luxembourg, the Netherlands, Switzerland and United Kingdom. An extended version of the single remix is included on the 12-inch and CD-single formats, and a different remix ("Sanjazz") was released in the UK on an alternative 12-inch single.

== Critical reception ==
Jack Barron from NME wrote, "Kim Wilde, meanwhile, has done the unthinkable and cross-fertilised Blondie with Ultravox thus producing an empty Box and spoiling her run of sparkling singles."

== Track listings ==
- 7-inch single
1. "Never Trust a Stranger" – 4:07
2. "Wotcha Gonna Do" – 4:07

Note: Also available in gatefold sleeve (MCA / KIMSG9)

- 12-inch single 1
1. "Never Trust a Stranger" (Julian Mendelsohn extended version) – 6:02
2. "You Came" (Shep Pettibone remix) – 7:37
3. "Wotcha Gonna Do" – 4:00

Note: Also available on CD (MCA / DKIM9)

- 12-inch single 2
1. "Never Trust a Stranger" (The Sanjazz mix) – 5:45
2. "Wotcha Gonna Do" – 4:00
3. "Never Trust a Stranger" (Julian Mendelsohn extended version) – 6:02

== Charts ==
=== Weekly charts ===
Chart (1988)	Peak position
Austria (Ö3 Austria Top 40)	7
Belgium (Ultratop 50 Flanders)	6
Denmark (IFPI)	2
Europe (Eurochart Hot 100)	17
Finland (Suomen virallinen lista)	4
France (SNEP)	20
Ireland (IRMA)	5
Luxembourg (Radio Luxembourg)	7
Netherlands (Dutch Top 40)	4
Netherlands (Single Top 100)	3
Sweden (Sverigetopplistan)	12
Switzerland (Schweizer Hitparade)	4
UK Singles (Official Charts)	7
West Germany (GfK)	11

=== Year-end charts ===
Chart (1988)	Position
Belgium (Ultratop)	97
Netherlands (Dutch Top 40)	80
Netherlands (Single Top 100)	80

== Release history ==
Region	Date	Format(s)	Label(s)	Ref(s).
United Kingdom	19 September 1988	7-inch vinyl; 12-inch vinyl; CD	MCA	
United Kingdom	3 October 1988	Limited-edition 7-inch vinyl; 12-inch remix vinyl	MCA	
Japan	10 December 1988	Mini-CD	MCA	
