= Ricky Wilde =

British musician (born 1961)

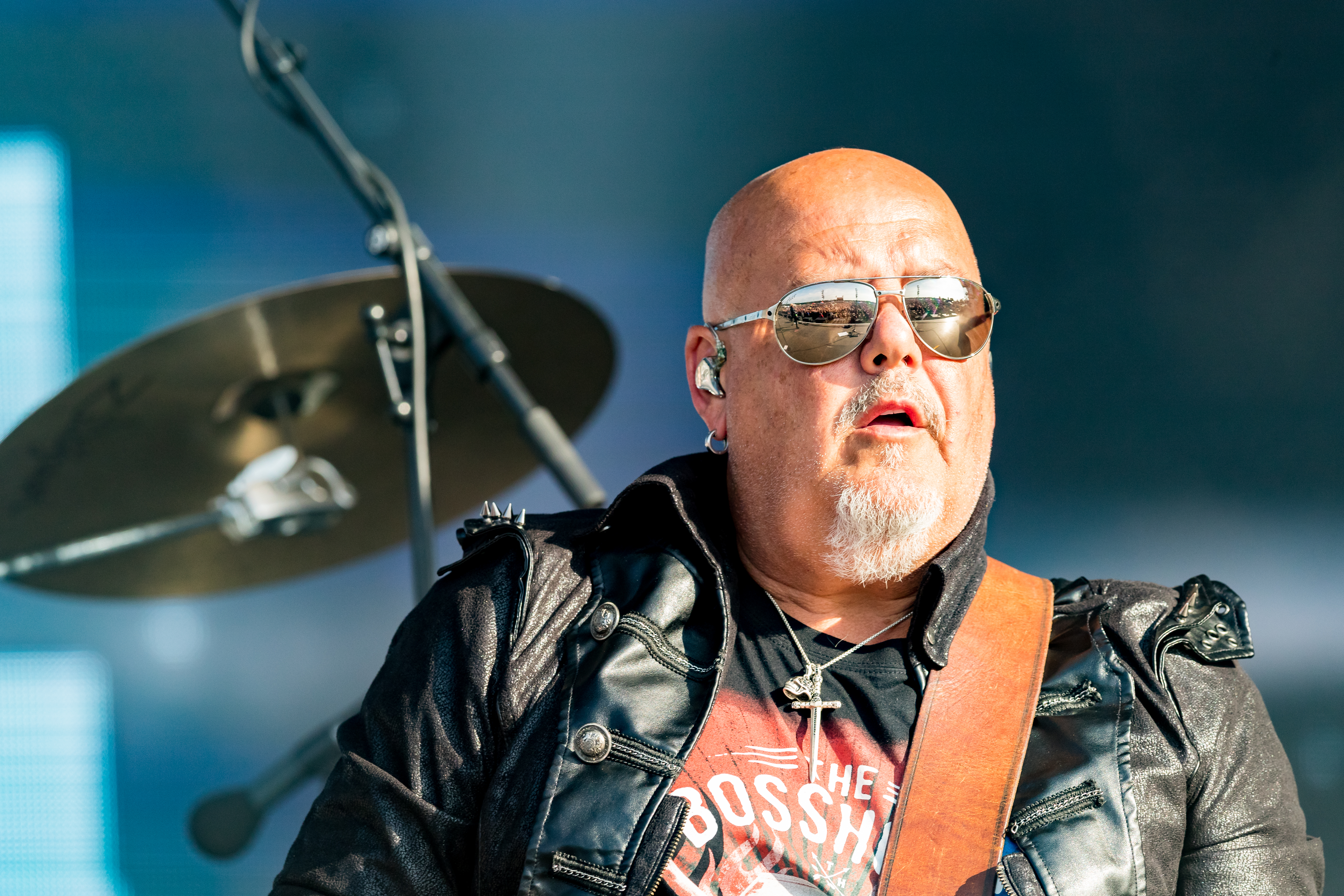
- Wilde in 2019

Background information
- Also known as: Ricki Wilde
- Born: Ricki Steven Reginald Smith; 6 November 1961 (age 64)
- Origin: England, UK
- Occupations: Songwriter; musician; record producer
- Instruments: Guitar; keyboards; vocals
- Label: UK
- Father: Marty Wilde
- Relatives: Kim Wilde (sister); Roxanne Wilde (sister)

Ricky Wilde (born Ricki Steven Reginald Smith, 6 November 1961, sometimes credited as Ricki Wilde) is a British songwriter, musician, and record producer. He is the younger brother of singer Kim Wilde; their father is singer and songwriter Marty Wilde.

== Career ==
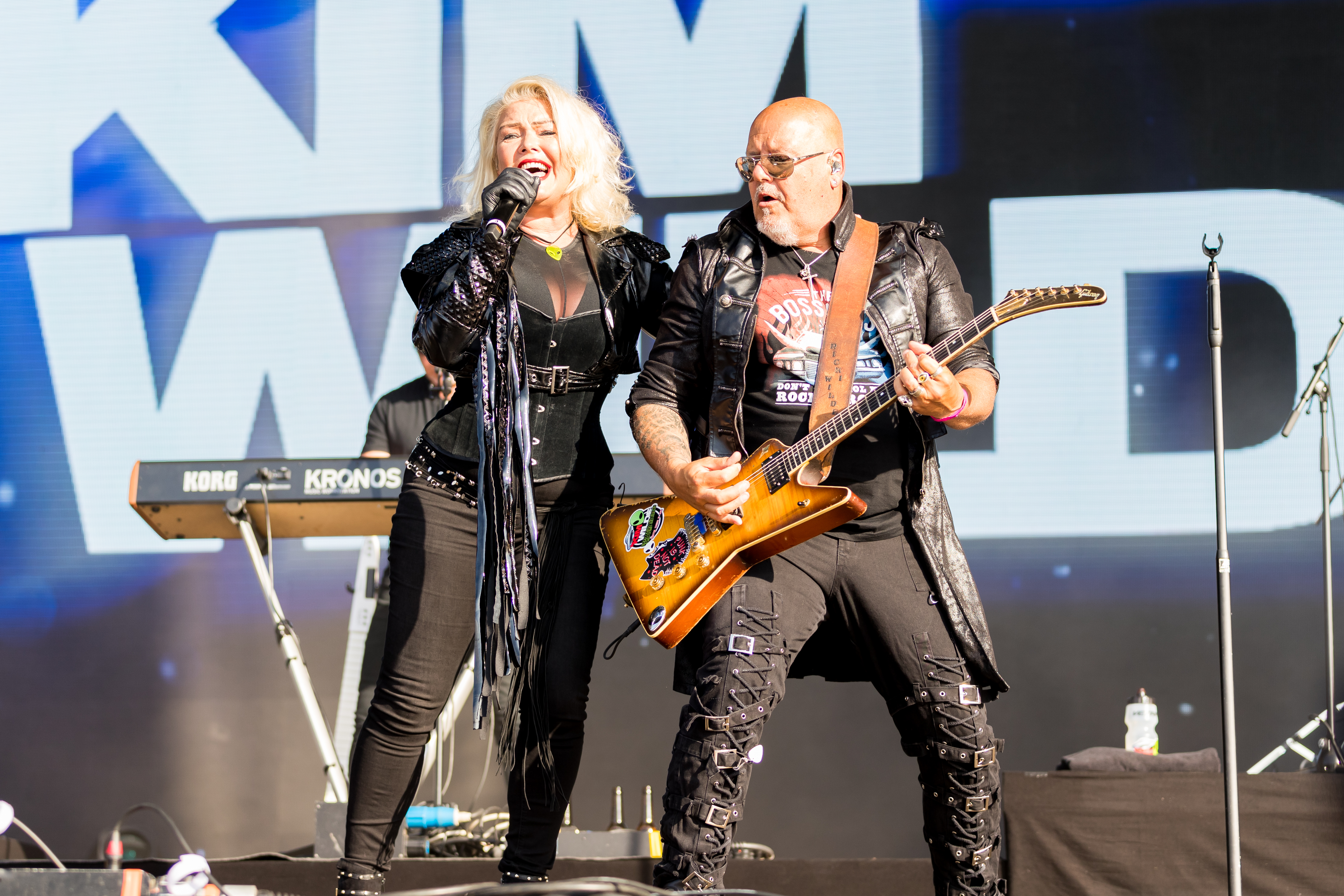
Ricky performing with sister Kim Wilde in 2019

At the age of eleven, Wilde was signed by record producer Jonathan King to King's UK Records label, and released his first single in November 1972, called "I Am an Astronaut". King became his mentor and had great faith in Wilde and groomed him for stardom as the teenybopper star of 1973. The children's magazine Look-in featured Wilde and Donny Osmond on the cover in June 1973 with the headline "Is Ricky Wilde the new Donny?". Subsequent singles were "Do It Again, a Little Bit Slower", "I Wanna Go to a Disco" and "Teen Wave". However, the singles were not successful in the UK, although he was featured in youth magazines at the time and appeared with his father alongside eleven years old pop rival Darren Burn in BBC Television's Man Alive documentary film Twinkle Twinkle Little Star, made in July 1973. He had some hits in Scandinavia and Spain at the time.

Recordings of new material in 1980 led to the 'discovery' of his sister Kim. Ricky's new role was that of producer and co-writer, a role he has fulfilled up until now. By his own admission, he was happy to be more in the background as of that moment. After Kim Wilde paused her career in pop music, Ricky Wilde continued to work in the music industry. In 2005 he was one of the initiators of the band, Sonic Hub, and of the record label Sonic Hub Records.

He co-directed the film Shoot The DJ, released in 2010.

"I Am an Astronaut" was covered by Snow Patrol for the Save the Children compilation album Colours Are Brighter; it also featured as a B-side to their single "Open Your Eyes". It was translated into Swedish, and recorded by nine-year-old Linus Wahlgren in 1985. The Swedish version was later covered by Wahlgren's nephew Benjamin Ingrosso in 2007, also at nine years of age. Ricky started a podcast with famous blogger Lee Bennett and Eastenders soap star Jake Wood called 'Unsung Heroes', talking to songwriters and producers behind the scenes in the music industry.

=== Influences ===
Wilde has named OMD as "heroes" and a key source of inspiration. Other influences have included Ultravox, John Foxx, Gary Numan, Skids and the Stranglers.

== Discography ==
Wilde has writing and production credits on Kim Wilde albums.
