= The Hits Collection (Kim Wilde album) =

Greatest hits album by Kim Wilde
- Released: 16 August 2006
- Recorded: 1981–1983
- Genre: Pop
- Length: 73:50
- Label: EMI

Kim Wilde chronology
| The Very Best of Kim Wilde (2001) | The Hits Collection (2006) | Never Say Never (2006) |

The Hits Collection is a compilation album by the English pop singer Kim Wilde. The album was released on March 6, 2006. Originally the album was intended to be a repackaged version of the 1996 compilation Best of Kim Wilde. When the album was announced, the webmaster of Wilde's fansite contacted EMI and asked if it would be a better idea to release a new compilation of Wilde's EMI 'first' years of 1981-1983 instead. EMI agreed, and so this compilation came to be.

This compilation assembles the first eight 7" A-sides of Wilde's career (tracks 1 through 8) as well as their respective B-sides (tracks 9 through 16), in chronological order. Versions included on the original singles had been the album versions, except "Water on Glass" which was remixed, and "Love Blonde" which was edited. Those two single versions appear here. "Can You Hear It" is not the original 7" version though, but the reworked album version.

Also included is the 1982 Japan-only A-side "Bitter Is Better", unreleased in the UK until this CD. The last two tracks are the two extended versions (12" A-sides) released in the time frame.

== Track listing ==
| No. | Title | Length |
|---|---|---|
| 1. | "Kids in America" | 3:28 |
| 2. | "Chequered Love" | 3:22 |
| 3. | "Water on Glass" | 3:37 |
| 4. | "Cambodia" | 3:57 |
| 5. | "View from a Bridge" | 3:31 |
| 6. | "Child Come Away" | 4:05 |
| 7. | "Love Blonde" | 3:34 |
| 8. | "Dancing in the Dark" | 3:44 |
| 9. | "Tuning In Tuning On" | 4:24 |
| 10. | "Shane" | 3:42 |
| 11. | "Boys" | 3:14 |
| 12. | "Watching For Shapes" | 3:44 |
| 13. | "Take Me Tonight" | 3:54 |
| 14. | "Just Another Guy" | 3:21 |
| 15. | "Can You Hear It" | 4:27 |
| 16. | "Back Street Driver" | 3:33 |
| 17. | "Bitter Is Better" | 3:44 |
| 18. | "Love Blonde" (12" Version) | 5:01 |
| 19. | "Dancing in the Dark" (Nile Rodgers 12" Version) | 5:28 |

== Charts ==
Chart performance for The Hits Collection
| Chart (2006–2007) | Peak position |
|---|---|
| Australian Albums (ARIA) | 82 |
