= The Very Best of Kim Wilde (2001 album) =

Greatest hits album by Kim Wilde
- Released: 5 November 2001
- Recorded: 1981–2001
- Genre: Pop
- Label: EMI

Kim Wilde chronology
Now & Forever (1995)	The Very Best of Kim Wilde (2001)	The Hits Collection (2006)

The Very Best of Kim Wilde is a compilation album by British singer Kim Wilde. It was released in November 2001 and contained 15 Top 20 hits from the UK and German charts and was virtually identical to her 1993 hits collection. Also included was a new song, "Loved", which was released as a single in a number of countries - her first in six years, reaching the Top 10 in Belgium and Top 20 in Finland. Remixes of her two hits: "Kids in America" and "View from a Bridge" completed the collection - the former also released as a single in some territories. The Very Best of Kim Wilde was a hit in the Scandinavian Countries, where it made the Top 20.

== Track listing ==
1. "Kids in America" (3:27)
2. "Chequered Love" (3:22)
3. "Water on Glass" (3:37)
4. "Cambodia" (3:57)
5. "View From a Bridge" (3:31)
6. "Child Come Away" (4:05)
7. "Love Blonde" (3:34)
8. "Rage to Love" (4:19)
9. "You Keep Me Hangin' On" (4:15)
10. "Another Step (Closer to You)" (3:31)
11. "You Came" (3:30)
12. "Never Trust a Stranger" (4:05)
13. "Four Letter Word" (4:02)
14. "Love Is Holy" (4:02)
15. "If I Can't Have You" (3:29)
16. "Loved" (3:32)
17. "View from a Bridge (Raw Remix Edit)" (4:25)
18. "Kids in America (D-Bop's Bright Lights Mix Edit)" (4:03)

== Charts ==
Chart (2001–2002)	Peak position
Finnish Albums (Suomen virallinen lista)	23
Swedish Albums (Sverigetopplistan)	20
UK Albums (OCC)	164
