= The Very Best of Kim Wilde (1984 album) =

Greatest hits album by Kim Wilde
- Released: 1 November 1984
- Recorded: 1980–1983
- Genre: Rock, pop
- Label: RAK Records

Professional ratings
Review scores
Source	Rating
Allmusic	3/5 stars

The Very Best of Kim Wilde is a compilation album by Kim Wilde. The album was released in November 1984, after she left the RAK Record label. It featured tracks taken from her first three albums, the non-album singles, "Child Come Away" and "Bitter is Better" (Japan only) and a B-side ("Boys").

== Track listing ==
1. "Kids in America"
2. "Chequered Love"
3. "Water on Glass"
4. "2-6-5-8-0"
5. "Boys"
6. "Our Town"
7. "Everything We Know"
8. "You'll Never Be So Wrong"
9. "Cambodia"
10. "View From a Bridge"
11. "Love Blonde"
12. "House of Salome"
13. "Dancing in the Dark"
14. "Child Come Away"
15. "Take Me Tonight"
16. "Stay Awhile"
17. "Bitter Is Better" (Japanese edition)

== Charts ==
Chart (1984–1985)	Peak position
Australian Albums (Kent Music Report)	13
German Albums (Offizielle Top 100)	61
Swiss Albums (Schweizer Hitparade)	25
UK Albums (OCC)	78
Finnish Albums (Suomen virallinen lista)	23
