= The International Swingers =

American–British rock supergroup

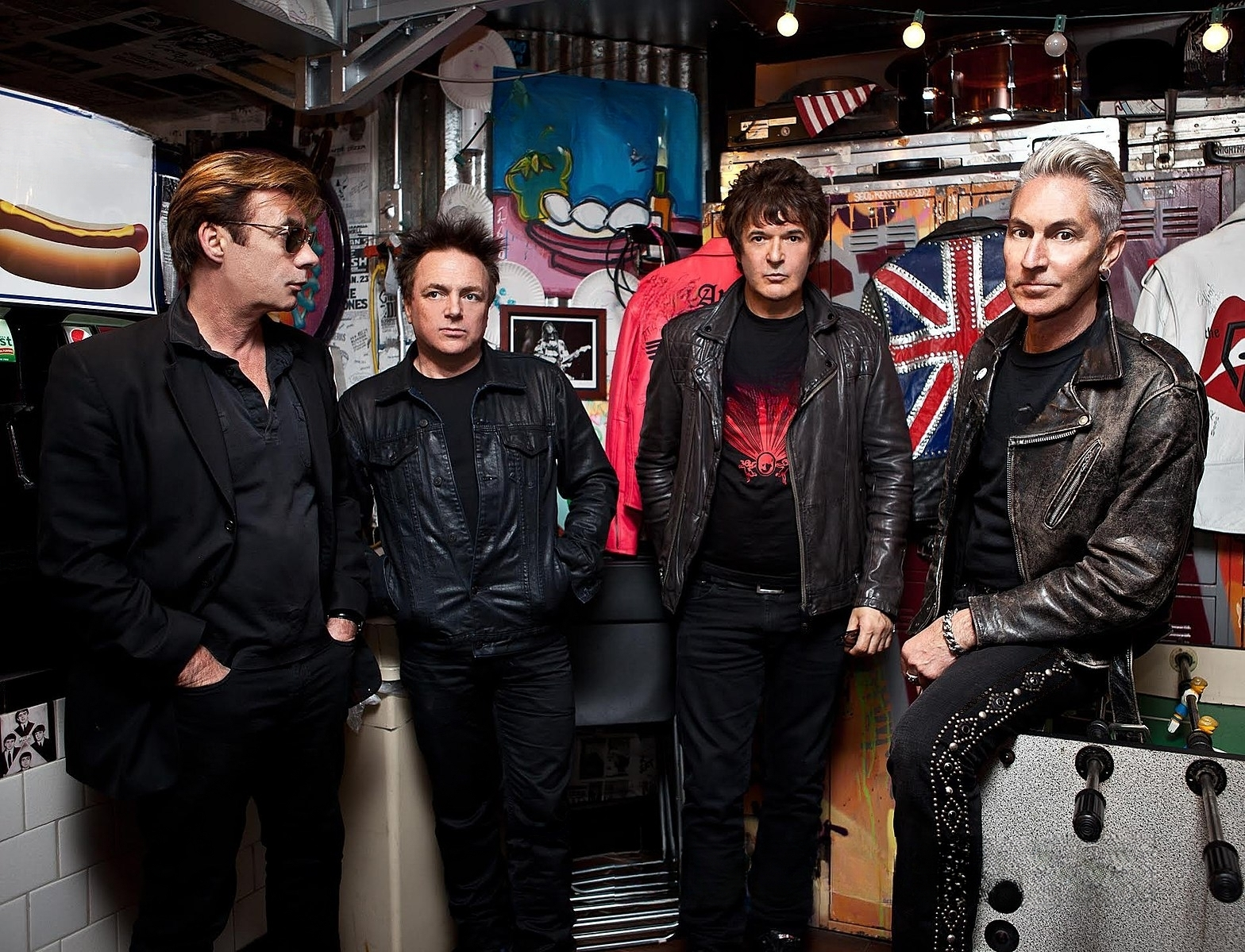
- The International Swingers (2015)

Background information
- Origin: Los Angeles, California, United States
- Genres: Rock, rock 'n' roll, punk rock
- Years active: 2011–2025
- Spinoffs: Blondie, Sex Pistols, Chelsea, Generation X, Gene Loves Jezebel, Supernaut, Twenty Flight Rockers
- Past members: Clem Burke; Glen Matlock; James Stevenson; Gary Twinn
- Website: theinternationalswingers.com

The International Swingers was an American–British rock supergroup based in Los Angeles Formed in late 2011, the band is composed of Clem Burke (drums), Glen Matlock (bass/vocals), James Stevenson (lead guitar/vocals) and Gary Twinn (lead vocals/guitar).

== History ==
Each member first came to the public's attention as a member of another band (Clem Burke in Blondie, Glen Matlock in the Sex Pistols, James Stevenson in Chelsea, Generation X and Gene Loves Jezebel, Gary Twinn in Supernaut and Twenty Flight Rockers). During their career, the four musicians became well known to each other, all of them had already worked together in different capacities, but never all in the same group at the same time. In 2011, Australian promoter Bicci Henderson suggested Gary formed a new band for a tour there, instead of a reformed Supernaut. Gary contacted James, Clem and Glen, then during rehearsals and the Australian tour they got along well and The International Swingers continued. In 2012 through 2014 the band performed tours in the United States and in 2013 a sold out show in London.

Initially they played a set of the greatest hits of all the bands they had been in, but soon they began writing new songs for The International Swingers, like "FBI" (included in the soundtrack of the film Homefront), "Gun Control" (about gun politics in the United States, originally a Twenty Flight Rockers song entitled "Guns for Sale") and "Live Wire".

Via PledgeMusic, the band raised the money to record their first full-length self-titled album, The International Swingers (originally under the working title Whatever Works Now). The album was recorded at Studio 606 in LA which is owned by the Foo Fighters. It was then mixed by Peter Walsh who has worked with Simple Minds, Pulp and most recently Scott Walker.

== Members ==
=== Clem Burke ===
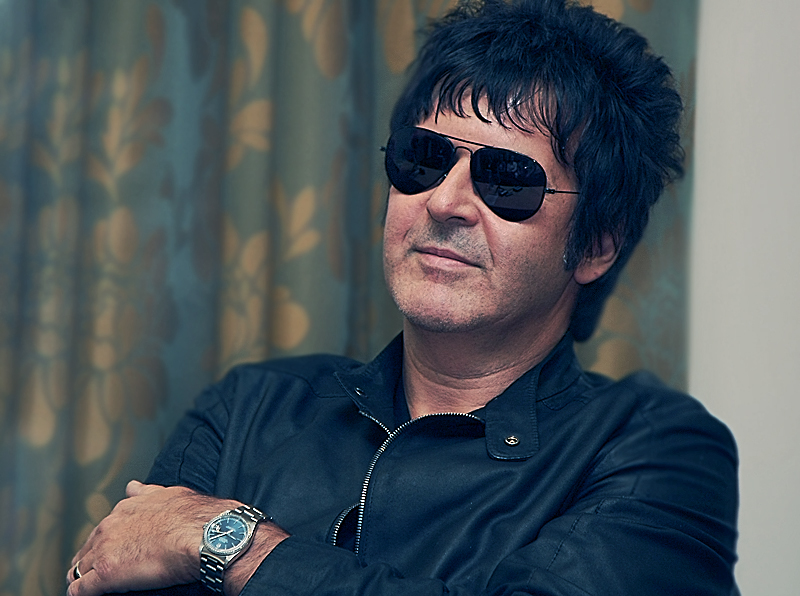
Clem Burke

Clem Burke is best known as the drummer for the band Blondie from 1975, shortly after the band formed, throughout the band's entire career, including the reunion and extensive 2009 - 2011 tour. During the 1980s and 1990s, when Blondie was on hiatus, he performed with Bob Dylan, Eurythmics, Iggy Pop, Joan Jett, country star Wanda Jackson, Nancy Sinatra, The Romantics, Pete Townshend, Dramarama, and The Fleshtones, amongst others. In 1987 and also later in 2004, he stood in as drummer for the Ramones (under the name "Elvis Ramone").

Clem was inducted in the Rock and Roll Hall of Fame in 2006 along with his other Blondie bandmates. In July 2011, he received an honorary doctorate from the University of Gloucestershire, as a result of his drumming project that analyses the physical and psychological effects of drumming.

=== Glen Matlock ===
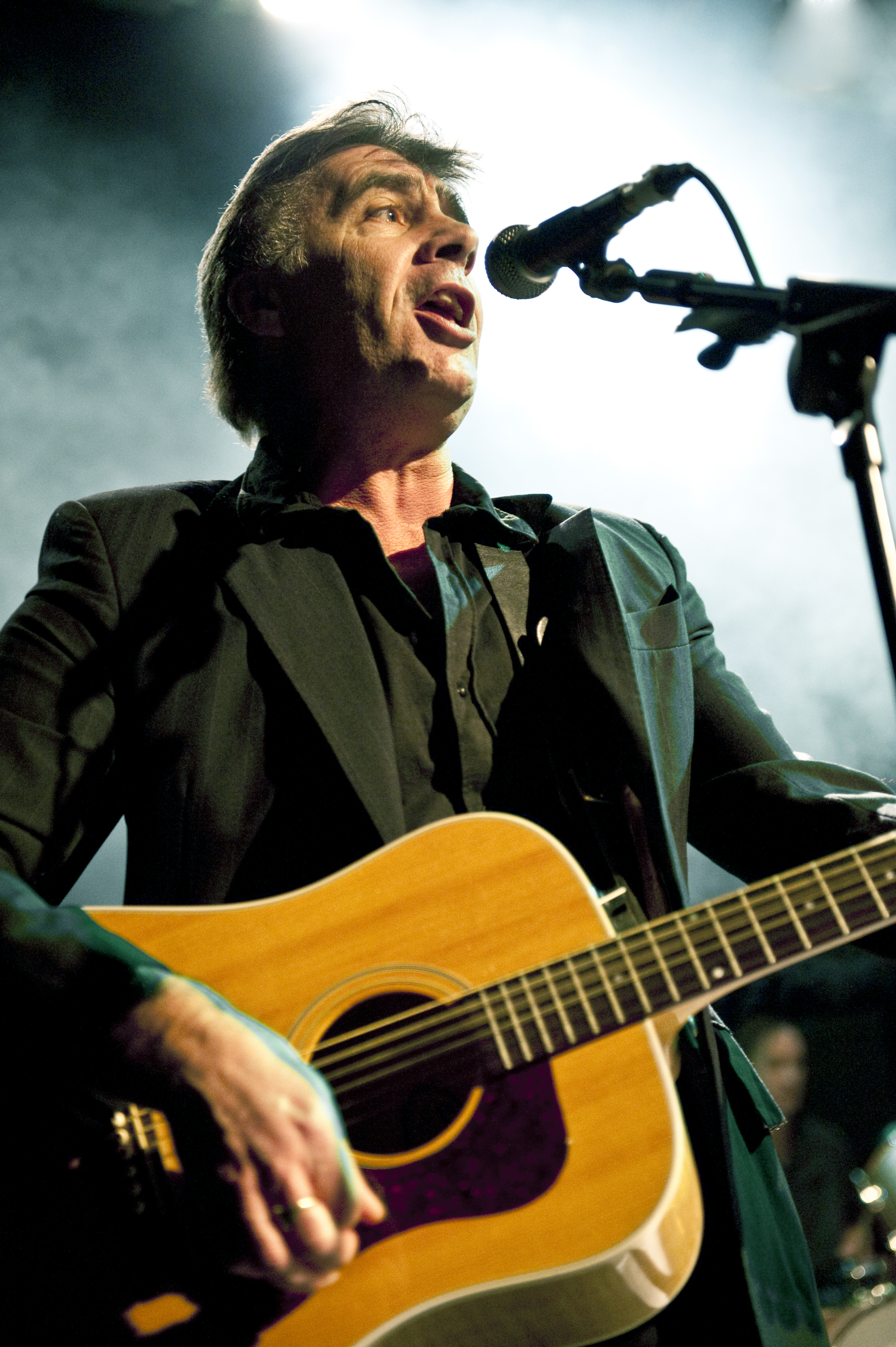
Glen Matlock

Glen Matlock is best known as the bass guitarist in the original line-up of the punk rock band the Sex Pistols. He is credited as a co-author on 10 of the 12 songs on Never Mind the Bollocks, Here's the Sex Pistols. He left the band in 1977, and went on to form the Rich Kids, a new wave power pop band. He also worked with Iggy Pop (album Soldier), The Damned (album Not of This Earth), and Robert Gordon. He rejoined the original Sex Pistols members for reunion tours in 1996, 2002, 2003, 2007 and 2008.

Matlock was inducted in the Rock and Roll Hall of Fame in 2006 along with the other original members of Sex Pistols.

=== James Stevenson ===
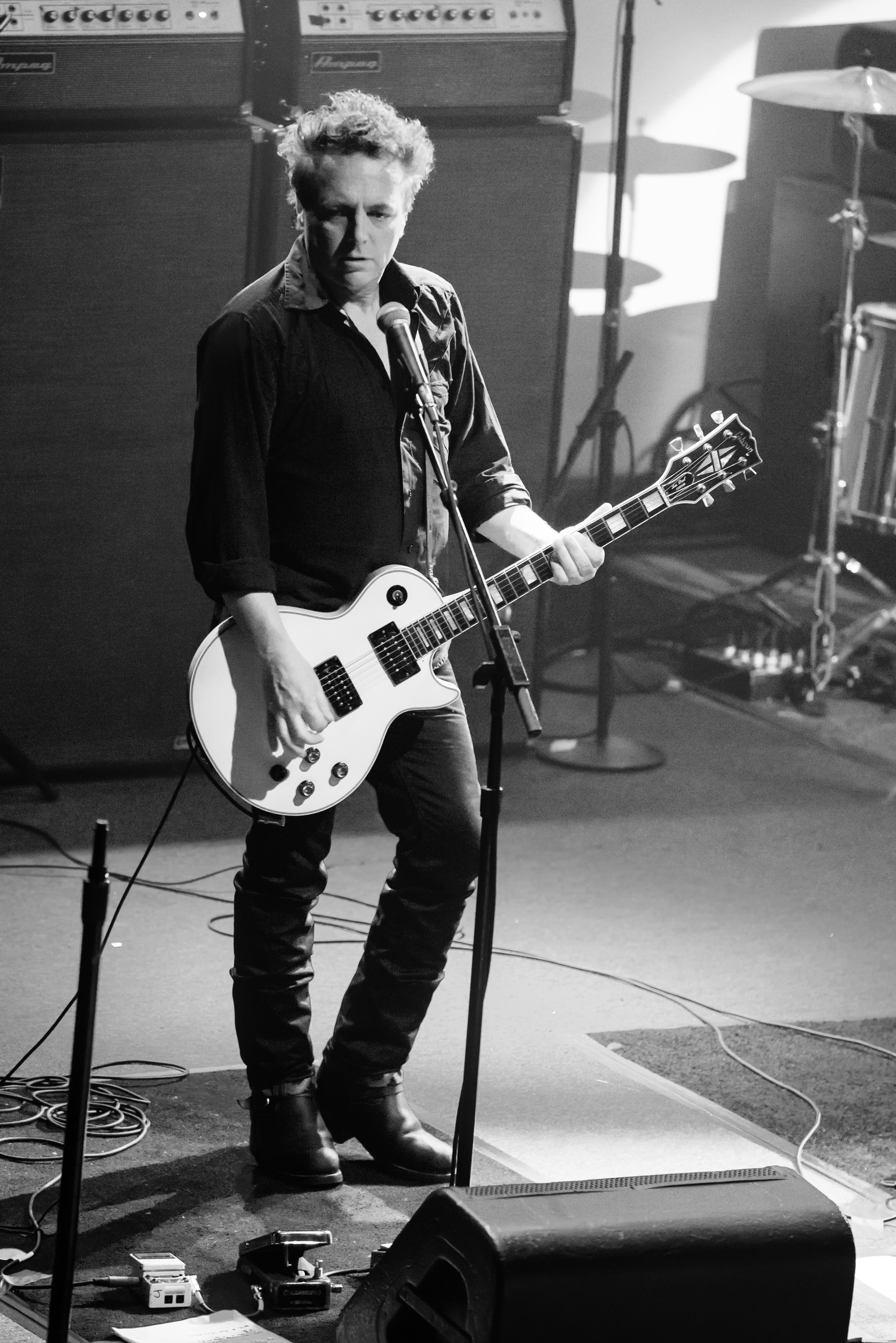
James Stevenson

James Stevenson is a punk/alternative rock guitarist, appearing with The Cult, The Alarm, Gene Loves Jezebel (also co-writer of hit songs such as "Jealous"), Gen X and Chelsea. He also played for Kim Wilde, contributing to her first album Kim Wilde and second album Select and performing in all of Wilde's early videos including "Kids in America".

=== Gary Twinn ===
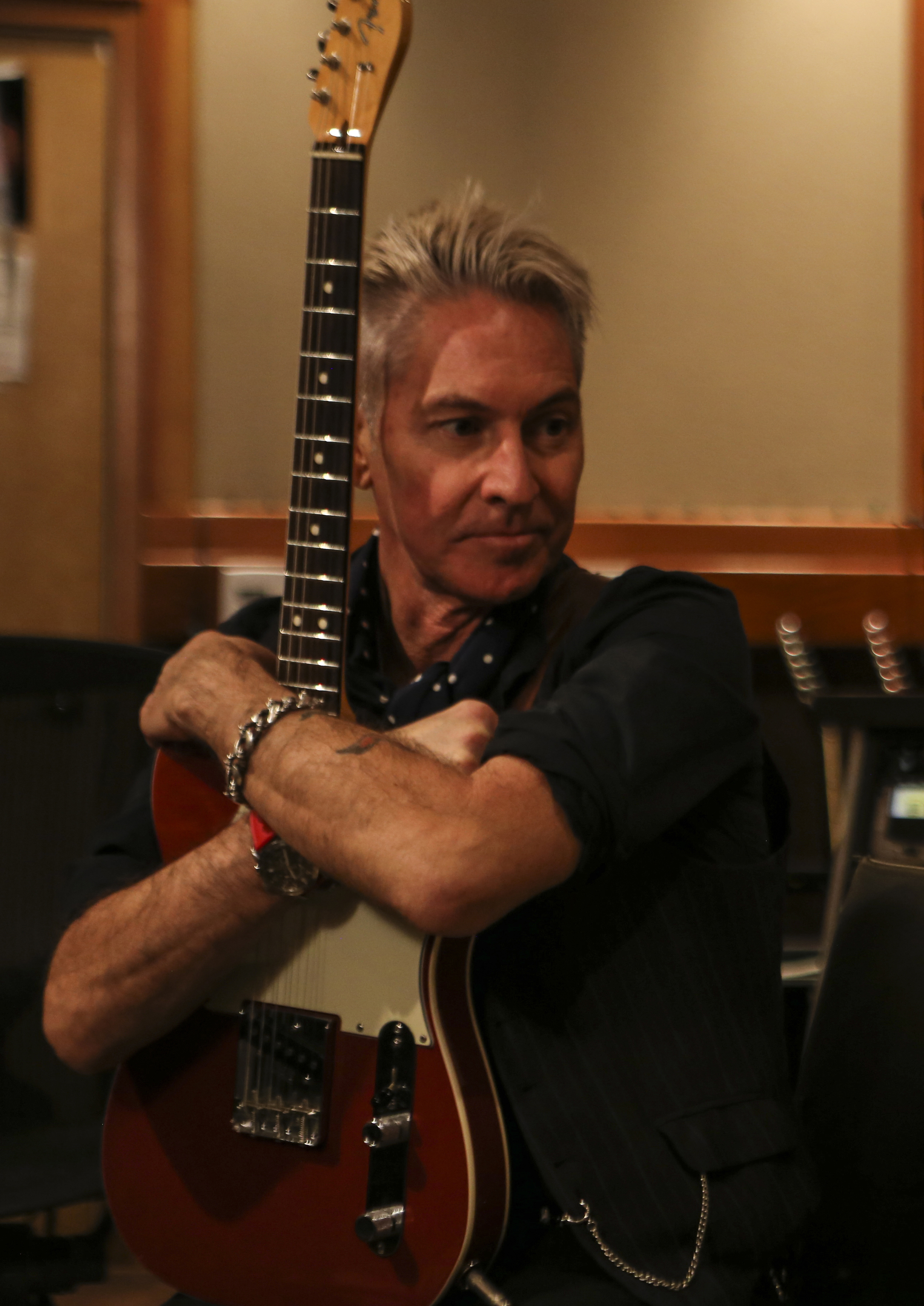
Gary Twinn

Gary Twinn spent his teenage years in Australia where he was singer for glam/punk rock band Supernaut. After making a mark with chart topping songs, such as "I Like It Both Ways", a gold album and several TV awards for best new band and video performance, Gary returned to the UK and formed Twenty Flight Rockers with Mark Laff of Generation X. Then he was part of the Californian rock band Honeydippers and later, teamed up with Rat Scabies, Glen Matlock and Bob "Derwood" Andrews and formed the group Dead Horse. Gary and Derwood also wrote and recorded together as the alternative country group Speedtwinn.
