= Supernaut =

Supernaut may refer to:

- "Supernaut" (song), a song by Black Sabbath on the 1972 album Black Sabbath, Vol 4
- Supernaut (Australian band), an Australian glam/punk rock band from the 1970s
  - Supernaut (album), 1976
- Supernaut (Serbian band), a Serbian alternative rock band
