= The Very Best of Kim Wilde =

The Very Best of Kim Wilde may refer to:

- The Very Best of Kim Wilde (1984 album)
- The Very Best of Kim Wilde (2001 album)
