= Too Hot to Touch =

Single by Supernaut

from the album Supernaut
- Released: September 1976
- Genre: Glam rock
- Length: 3:58
- Label: Polydor Records
- Songwriter(s): Chris Burnham; Joe Burnham; Gary Twinn
- Producer(s): Tony Cohen

Supernaut singles chronology
| "I Like It Both Ways" (1976) | "Too Hot to Touch" (1976) | "Let's Spend the Night Together" (1977) |

"Too Hot to Touch" is a song by Australian glam rock band Supernaut, released in September 1976 as the second and final single from the band's debut studio album, Supernaut (1976). The song peaked at number 14 on the Australian Kent Music Report.

== Track listing ==
7" (Polydor 2079 091)

- Side A "Too Hot to Touch" - 3:58
- Side B "Lick My Lolly" - 3:36

== Charts ==
| Chart (1976/77) | Peak position |
|---|---|
| Australian Kent Music Report Singles Chart | 14 |
