= This I Swear =

This I Swear may refer to:

- "This I Swear" (Nick Lachey song), 2003
- "This I Swear" (Kim Wilde song), 1996
- "This I Swear" by The Skyliners, Calico Records, 1959
