= Catch as Catch Can (album) =

Studio album by Kim Wilde
- Released: 24 October 1983
- Recorded: 1983
- Studios: RAK Studios and Wessex Sound Studios (London, UK); Nirvam Studios (Hertfordshire, UK).
- Genres: Pop, synth-pop
- Length: 41:35
- Label: RAK
- Producer: Ricky Wilde

Kim Wilde chronology
Select (1982)	Catch as Catch Can (1983)	Teases & Dares (1984)

Singles from Catch as Catch Can
- 1. "Love Blonde" Released: 18 July 1983; 2. "Dancing in the Dark" Released: 24 October 1983; 3. "House of Salome" Released: 30 January 1984

Catch as Catch Can is the third studio album by the English pop singer Kim Wilde, released in autumn 1983. The album was not released in North America, nor any of the singles.

Having toured the UK and Europe in November and December 1982, there was a silence of six months. Kim Wilde returned with the single "Love Blonde", a jazz/swing-inspired track that lyrically mocked the blonde bombshell image that some media had dealt Kim in the previous years. But the sound was unique to the single; the rest of the album continued the electronic theme that was introduced on Select. Most of the songs were again written by Marty and Ricky Wilde, except the second single "Dancing in the Dark", which was written by Nicky Chinn and Paul Gurvitz. Ricky Wilde produced the album.

Some of the songs seemed to be telling a story ("House of Salome", which was released as a single in selected countries, and "Sing It Out for Love") whereas "Dream Sequence" was one of Marty's more imaginative lyrics, describing what seems to be a random sequence of images. The cool blue cover image was provided by photographer Sheila Rock.

The album suffered from mixed reviews in the press and the lack of successful singles. Even a second European tour could not help the decline in sales.

At the time of release, the new compact disc format was introduced. In Japan, the album was released on this new format. In later years, this release became a much sought-after item among Kim Wilde fans, who often paid more than $100 to get their hands on a copy. Elsewhere in the world, the album has been released on CD only once, as part of a 3-CD box set named The Originals (1995). Available for a limited period only, this also has become a collectable item. It was finally re-released on 18 May 2009 as a remastered special edition following Kim Wilde and Select in April.

== Critical response ==
Professional ratings
Review scores
Source	Rating
AllMusic	3/5 stars
Record Collector	4/5 stars
Record Mirror	4/5 stars
Smash Hits	3/10

Catch as Catch Can received mixed reviews from contemporary critics. Jessi McGuire of Record Mirror found that the album contained "something for everyone" and praised Ricky Wilde for "showing a constantly changing style" in his songwriting, while comparing Kim's "young and snotty" voice to Michael Jackson's on songs such as the "hot and funky" "Back Street Joe". McGuire was less receptive to the song "Sparks", which was described as coming "dangerously close to sounding like good old Cliff (National Pop Institution) Richard himself". In a negative review, Josephine Hocking of Smash Hits described Wilde's voice as "pretty-but-slight" and panned the album's songs as "a mass of uninspired synth patterns and plodding arrangements."

== Track listing ==
All songs written by Marty Wilde and Ricky Wilde except where indicated.

Side one

1. "House of Salome" – 3:36
2. "Back Street Joe" – 4:31
3. "Stay Awhile" – 3:42
4. "Love Blonde" – 4:08
5. "Dream Sequence" – 6:06

Side two

1. "Dancing in the Dark" (Nicky Chinn, Paul Gurvitz) – 3:44
2. "Shoot to Disable" – 3:37
3. "Can You Hear It" – 4:29
4. "Sparks" – 4:08
5. "Sing It Out for Love" – 3:34

Bonus tracks (2009 remastered CD edition)

11. "Love Blonde" (7" version)
12. "Back Street Driver" ("Dancing in the Dark" B-side)
13. "Love Blonde" (12" version)
14. "Dancing in the Dark" (Nile Rodgers Re-Mix) (Chinn, Gurvitz)
15. "Dancing in the Dark" (Instrumental) (Chinn, Gurvitz)

== Personnel ==
- Kim Wilde – Vocals
- Ricky Wilde – keyboards, Synclavier, guitars, bass, Roland MC-8 Microcomposer, LinnDrum programming, backing vocals
- Steve Byrd – Guitar, backing vocals
- Mark Hayward Chaplin – Bass, backing vocals
- Trevor Murrell – Drums
- Gary Barnacle – Saxophones, flute

== Production ==
- Ricky Wilde – producer
- Keith Fernley, Will Gosling, Simon Schofield and Pete Schwier – engineers
- Nile Rodgers – mixing on "Dancing in the Dark"
- Chris Dickie, Mike Nocito and Dietmar Schillinger – tape ops
- Malcolm Garrett – album design
- Sheila Rock – photography

== Charts ==
Chart (1983–1984)	Peak position
Australian Albums (Kent Music Report)	97
Dutch Albums (Album Top 100)	35
Finnish Albums (Suomen virallinen lista)	1
German Albums (Offizielle Top 100)	23
Swedish Albums (Sverigetopplistan)	17
Swiss Albums (Schweizer Hitparade)	6
UK Albums (Official Charts)	90

Chart (2020)	Peak position
Belgian Albums (Ultratop Wallonia)	198
Scottish Albums (Official Charts)	67
UK Independent Albums (Official Charts)	24
UK Album Sales Chart(OCC)	73

== Certifications and sales ==
Region	Certification	Certified units/sales
Finland (Musiikkituottajat)	Gold	20,000
