= Never Say Never (Kim Wilde album) =

Studio album by Kim Wilde
- Released: 8 September 2006
- Recorded: 2005–2006
- Genre: Pop rock
- Label: EMI
- Producer: Ricky Wilde, Uwe Fahrenkrog-Petersen

Kim Wilde chronology
The Hits Collection (2006)	Never Say Never (2006)	Come Out and Play (2010)

Singles from Never Say Never
- 1. "You Came 2006" Released: 18 August 2006; 2. "Perfect Girl" Released: 17 November 2006; 3. "Together We Belong" Released: 30 March 2007; 4. "Baby Obey Me" Released: 3 August 2007

Never Say Never is the tenth studio album by Kim Wilde and was released in September 2006. It was a comeback album after being away from the music business for a number of years and her first studio album for eleven years. The album features several of Wilde's hits that have been updated with modern dance beats, interspersed with eight new songs.

== Overview ==
The album was co-produced by Uwe Fahrenkrog-Petersen, a former member of German band Nena and Wilde's brother and long-time collaborator Ricky.

After a comparatively long period of negotiations, Kim Wilde finally signed a new record deal with the German division of EMI in late 2005. In July 2006, it was confirmed that a new album, entitled Never Say Never, would be released in Germany on 8 September 2006. The album has since been released across Europe and in Japan.

A single, a re-working of Wilde's 1988 hit "You Came", preceded the album and became her biggest European hit in years. Wilde had announced the sound of the album would be strongly reminiscent of her earlier work. The 14-track album featured eight new songs and six new versions of earlier hits, including "You Keep Me Hangin' On" as a duet with Nena and "Kids in America", as a duet with Charlotte Hatherley. "Cambodia" appears as a bonus track in a remix by Paul Oakenfold.

The second single was "Perfect Girl", released in November 2006 and voted by fans through a poll on Wilde's official website. "Perfect Girl" spent 9 weeks in the German singles Top 100, reaching No. 52. It was also released in Belgium, Switzerland and (as a download only) the Netherlands. A third single, "Together We Belong", was released in March 2007, while a fourth, "Baby Obey Me", was released in August 2007 in two versions: the original album version and a remix featuring German rap artist Ill Inspecta.

The album was a moderate success, reaching the top 20 in several European countries. It has sold more than 70.000 copies in Europe.

== Track listing ==
No.	Title	Writer(s)	Length
1.	"Perfect Girl"	Ricky Wilde, Uwe Fahrenkrog-Petersen	3:46
2.	"You Came" (2006 version)	Kim Wilde, Ricky Wilde	3:10
3.	"Together We Belong"	Kim Wilde, Ricky Wilde, Fahrenkrog-Petersen	4:16
4.	"Forgive Me"	Kim Wilde, Fahrenkrog-Petersen, Gena Wernik	3:55
5.	"Four Letter Word" (2006 version)	Ricky Wilde, Marty Wilde	4:34
6.	"You Keep Me Hangin' On" (2006 version) (featuring Nena)	Brian Holland, Lamont Dozier, Edward Holland	3:10
7.	"Baby Obey Me"	Kim Wilde, Ricky Wilde, R.E. Orrall, Jeff Coplan	3:13
8.	"Kids in America" (2006 version) (featuring Charlotte Hatherley)	Marty Wilde, Ricky Wilde	3:23
9.	"I Fly"	Orrall, Coplan	2:59
10.	"Game Over"	Ricky Wilde, Steve DuBerry	3:49
11.	"Lost Without You"	Ricky Wilde, DuBerry	4:06
12.	"View from a Bridge" (2006 version)	Ricky Wilde, Marty Wilde	3:55
13.	"Maybe I'm Crazy"	Ricky Wilde, Thomas, Good	4:05
14.	"Cambodia" (Paul Oakenfold remix)	Ricky Wilde, Marty Wilde	5:19

Deluxe edition bonus DVD
No.	Title	Length
1.	"You Came" (Music video)	3:10
2.	"You Came" (Alternative music video – "In Bed with Kim Wilde")	3:10
3.	"You Came" (Groovenut Short edit)	6:33
4.	"A Date with Kim Wilde: The Never Say Never Interview"	23:57
5.	"Biography"
6.	"Photo Gallery"

== Charts ==
Chart performance for Never Say Never
Chart (2006)	Peak position
Austrian Albums (Ö3 Austria)	22
Belgian Albums (Ultratop Flanders)	32
Belgian Albums (Ultratop Wallonia)	78
Dutch Albums (Album Top 100)	32
Finnish Albums (Suomen virallinen lista)	30
French Albums (SNEP)	22
German Albums (Offizielle Top 100)	17
Swiss Albums (Schweizer Hitparade)	11
