= Select (album) =

- Cover photo by Gered Mankowitz

Studio album by Kim Wilde
- Released: 10 May 1982
- Recorded: 1981–1982
- Genres: Synth-pop; new wave
- Length: 40:44
- Label: RAK
- Producer: Ricky Wilde

Kim Wilde chronology
Kim Wilde (1981)	Select (1982)	Catch as Catch Can (1983)

Singles from Select
- 1. "Cambodia" / "Watching for Shapes" Released: November 1981; 2. "View from a Bridge" Released: April 1982; 3. "Take Me Tonight" Released: 1983 (Japan Only)

Select is the second studio album by the English pop singer Kim Wilde, released on 10 May 1982 by RAK Records. The album was not released in North America, and neither were the singles off the album.

== Overview ==
The first single from this album, "Cambodia", was released in November 1981 and signalled a different sound from Wilde, with an electronic and synth sound different from the rock sound of her previous studio album. The songs were again written by Marty and Ricky Wilde and produced by Ricky Wilde. The lyrics of the songs were similar to the first album: the second single "View from a Bridge" and the album track "Wendy Sadd" seemed to be about suicide, "Chaos at the Airport" described a nightmare about flying and "Ego" was quite the opposite of a love song. "Can You Come Over" was recorded at the Wilde's home. The cover image was a photograph from Gered Mankowitz.

This sequel to Wilde's debut studio album topped the charts in a host of European countries and reached number 8 in Australia, although it did not surpass the success of its predecessor.

Select has been re-released twice on CD, once in 2009 as a remastered and expanded edition and once in 2020 as a deluxe edition, including one unreleased track, a second CD with new remixes and a DVD. The original album was re-released on vinyl in 2020, including the original track list. Both 2020 CD and LP editions include new remasters.

== Critical reception ==
Professional ratings
Review scores
Source	Rating
AllMusic	4/5 stars
Record Collector	4/5 stars
Smash Hits	7/10

Select was initially received less favourably than Wilde's debut studio album. Stephen Waldon of Juke complimented Wilde's vocals and Marty and Ricky's songwriting, despite finding the production too "stylised in the current pop mode". He described "Just a Feeling" as "a beauty" and deemed "Cambodia" the album's best song. Elly McDonald from The Record critiqued Wilde's voice as "amazingly vacant" but praised Marty and Ricky for having "a wonderful sense of dramatic tension and an ear for soap operas within three verses". In a retrospective review, Stewart Mason of AllMusic felt Wilde had outgrown the "bubblegum tinge" of her earlier work: "The arrangements are more synth-oriented, at times approaching the dark atmospherics of Japan or Orchestral Manoeuvres in the Dark... her icy edge on this album is surprisingly appealing."

== Track listing ==
All songs written by Marty Wilde and Ricky Wilde, except where indicated

Side one

1. "Ego" – 4:11
2. "Words Fell Down" – 3:31
3. "Action City" – 3:25
4. "View from a Bridge" – 3:32
5. "Just a Feeling" – 4:12

Side two

1. "Chaos at the Airport" – 3:20
2. "Take Me Tonight" – 3:56
3. "Can You Come Over" – 3:35
4. "Wendy Sadd" – 3:49
5. "Cambodia + Reprise" – 7:13

Bonus tracks (2009 remastered CD edition)

11. "Watching for Shapes" ("Cambodia" B-side) – 3:42
12. "Cambodia" (Single Version) – 3:57
13. "Child Come Away" – 4:05
14. "Just Another Guy" ("Child Come Away" B-side) – 3:19
15. "Bitter Is Better" (Masami Tsuchiya, Bill Crunchfield) – 3:43

Track list (2020 Deluxe Edition) CD1

1. "Ego"
2. "Words fell down"
3. "Action City"
4. "View from a Bridge"
5. "Just a Feeling"
6. "Chaos at the Airport"
7. "Take Me Tonight"
8. "Can You Come Over"
9. "Wendy Sadd"
10. "Cambodia"
11. "Reprise"
12. "Child Come Away"
13. "Bitter Is Better"
14. "He Will Be There"
15. "Watching for Shapes"
16. "Just Another Guy"
17. "Bitter Is Better" (Instrumental)

CD2

1. "Ego" (Rough Mix)
2. "Words Fell Down" (Original Mix)
3. "Action City" (Instrumental Demo)
4. "Just a Feeling" (Rough Mix)
5. "Chaos at the Airport" (Rough Mix)
6. "Take Me Tonight" (Original Mix)
7. "Cambodia" (Matt Pop Extended Version)
8. "View from a Bridge" (Luke Mornay Remix)
9. "Child Come Away" (Matt Pop Remix)
10. "Cambodia" (Luke Mornay Urbantronik Mix)
11. "View from a Bridge" (Raw Remix)
12. "Child Come Away" (Matt Pop Instrumental)
13. "Cambodia" (Matt Pop Instrumental)
14. "View from a Bridge" (Luke Mornay Instrumental)
15. "Cambodia" (Luke Mornay Urbantronik Instrumental)

DVD The Videos

1. "Cambodia"
2. "View from a Bridge"
3. "Child Come Away"

Kim at the BBC

1. "Cambodia" (On Top of the Pops)
2. "View from a Bridge" (On Top of the Pops)
3. "View from a Bridge" (On Nationwide Special: The British Rock & Pop Wards)

== Charts ==
=== Weekly charts ===
Chart (1982)	Peak position
Australian Albums (Kent Music Report)	8
Austrian Albums (Ö3 Austria)	20
Dutch Albums (Album Top 100)	1
Finnish Albums (Suomen virallinen lista)	1
French Albums (SNEP)	3
German Albums (Offizielle Top 100)	4
Norwegian Albums (VG-lista)	12
Swedish Albums (Sverigetopplistan)	2
UK Albums (Official Charts)	19

Chart (2020)	Peak position
Belgian Albums (Ultratop Wallonia)	185
Scottish Albums (Official Charts)	58
UK Independent Albums (Official Charts)	18
UK Album Sales Chart(OCC)	63

=== Year-end charts ===
Chart (1982)	Position
Australian Albums (Kent Music Report)	85
Dutch Albums (Album Top 100)	47
German Albums (Offizielle Top 100)	50

== Certifications and sales ==
Region	Certification	Certified units/sales
Finland (Musiikkituottajat)	Gold	20,000
France (SNEP)	Gold	100,000^{*}
United Kingdom (BPI)	Silver	60,000^{^}
^{*} Sales figures based on certification alone.^{^} Shipments figures based on certification alone.
