= Loved (song) =

Single by Kim Wilde

from the album The Very Best of Kim Wilde (2001)
- B-side: "Loved (remix)"
- Released: 5 November 2001
- Recorded: 2001
- Genre: Pop
- Length: 3:30
- Label: EMI
- Songwriters: Ricki Wilde; Terry Ronald
- Producers: Ricki Wilde; Terry Ronald; Ian Masterson

Kim Wilde singles chronology
"Shame" (1996)	"Loved" (2001)	"Born to be Wild" (2002)

"Loved" is a song recorded by the English pop singer Kim Wilde as a "new" track for the compilation album The Very Best of Kim Wilde, released in 2001.

The song was co-written by Ricki Wilde and Terry Ronald.

The dance track was remixed and released in several of its remixed forms as a single across continental Europe, to some degree of success. New remixes of Wilde's 1980s hits "Kids in America" and "View from a Bridge" were also found on some formats of the single.

== Charts ==
Chart (2001)	Peak position
Belgium (Ultratop 50 Flanders)	7
Finland (Suomen virallinen lista)	19
Sweden (Sverigetopplistan)	45
Switzerland (Schweizer Hitparade)	68
