= Can't Get Enough =

Can't Get Enough may refer to:

== Albums ==
- Can't Get Enough (Barry White album), 1974
- Can't Get Enough (Eagle-Eye Cherry album), 2012
- Can't Get Enough (Eddy Grant album), 1981
- Can't Get Enough (Menudo album), 1986
- Can't Get Enough (Tommy Emmanuel album), 1996
- Can't Get Enough (The Rides album), 2013
- Can't Get Enough, an album by StoneBridge, 2004

== Songs ==
- "Can't Get Enough" (Bad Company song), 1974
- "Can't Get Enough" (Becky G song), 2013
- "Can't Get Enough" (J. Cole song), 2011
- "Can't Get Enough" (Jennifer Lopez song), 2024
- "Can't Get Enough" (Patty Loveless song), 1999
- "Can't Get Enough" (Suede song), 1999
- "Can't Get Enough" (Supergroove song), 1994
- "Can't Get Enough" (Tamia song), 2006
- "Can't Get Enough (Of Your Love)", a song by Kim Wilde, 1990
- "Can't Get Enough", a song by Big Time Rush from Another Life, 2023
- "Can't Get Enough", a song by Brutha
- "Can't Get Enough", a song by Claudette Ortiz
- "Can't Get Enough", a song by Kovas
- "Can't Get Enough", a song by Lostprophets from Weapons, 2012
- "Can't Get Enough", a song by Soulsearcher

== See also ==
- "Can't Get Enuff", a song by Winger
- "Can't Get Enough of You" (Eddy Grant song), from the above 1981 album
- "Can't Get Enough of You Baby", a song by the Four Seasons
- Can't Get Enough of Your Love (disambiguation)
- "I Can't Get Enough", a song by Benny Blanco, Tainy, Selena Gomez and J Balvin
- Just Can't Get Enough (disambiguation)
