= I Like It Both Ways =

Single by Supernaut

from the album Supernaut
- Released: May 1976
- Genre: Glam rock
- Length: 3:46
- Label: Polydor Records
- Songwriters: Chris Burnham; Joe Burnham; Gary Twinn
- Producer: Tony Cohen

Supernaut singles chronology
"I Like It Both Ways" (1976)	"Too Hot to Touch" (1976)

"I Like It Both Ways" is a song by Australian glam rock band Supernaut. The song was released in May 1976 as the debut single from the band's debut studio album, Supernaut (1976).

Musically, "I Like It Both Ways" is a tough glam number, with heavy riffing throughout, while the lyrics are about a characted, 'Johnny', who is bisexual. In the song, bisexuality is presented as an inability to choose between sexual preferences, rather than as a diversity of preferences to be embraced or condoned; Johnny is said to have a 'schizophrenic mind' and wonders whether he is 'deranged'.

== Recording ==
Producer Tony Cohen said, "We had trouble getting it down and if you listen to it closely you can hear it go in and out of time, all the time. We must have done twenty takes. Finally I gave up as it wasn't going to get any better."

== Track listing ==
7" (Polydor 2079 082)

- Side A "I Like it Both Ways" - 3:46
- Side B "Lightning"

== Charts ==
=== Weekly charts ===
Chart (1976)	Peak position
Australia (Kent Music Report)	16

=== Year-end charts ===
Chart (1976)	Position
Australia (Kent Music Report)	66

== Cover versions ==
- Not From There covered the song on the soundtrack Sample People (2000).
