= Can't Get Enough of Your Love (disambiguation) =

Can't Get Enough of Your Love is the title, partial title, or predominant chorus lyric of several popular songs:

- "Can't Get Enough of Your Love, Babe" by Barry White (1974); Taylor Dayne released a cover version in 1993
- "Can't Get Enough (Bad Company song)" (1974), often mistakenly called "Can't Get Enough of Your Love" after its refrain
- "Can't Get Enough (Of Your Love) by Kim Wilde (1990)

== See also ==
- Can't Get Enough (disambiguation)
- "Can't Get Enough of You Baby", a song by the Four Seasons (1965)
