= Fit In =

Fit In may refer to:

- "Fit In", a song on Kim Wilde's 1984 Teases & Dares
- "Fit In", a song on Lil Baby's 2018 Harder Than Ever
- "Fit In", a song by Anthony Crawford
