= World in Perfect Harmony =

Single by Kim Wilde

from the album Love Moves
- B-side: "Can't Get Enough (Of Your Love) (Remix)"
- Released: January 21, 1991
- Genre: Pop
- Length: 3:54
- Label: MCA
- Songwriters: Kim Wilde, Ricki Wilde
- Producer: Ricki Wilde

Kim Wilde singles chronology
| "I Can't Say Goodbye" (1990) | "World in Perfect Harmony" (1991) | "Love Is Holy" (1992) |

"World in Perfect Harmony" is the fifth and final single from the Love Moves album by Kim Wilde, released only in continental Europe.

The album version was used as the 7" A-side, although on some issues it is incorrectly stated that a remix appears. A remixed and extended version of the song was issued on the 12" and CD single format (though not in France). A remix of the previous single "Can't Get Enough (Of Your Love)" was used as the B-side (edited for the 7" single).

"World in Perfect Harmony" was not a chart success.

== Critical reception ==
Music & Media described the song as a "vague Motown beat and a PWL-like production which has the word pop written all over it. Top 40 radio will love it."
