= The Second Time =

1984 single by Kim Wilde

Single by Kim Wilde

from the album Teases & Dares
- B-side: "Lovers on a Beach"
- Released: 1 October 1984
- Studio: Select Sound (Knebworth, Hertfordshire)
- Genre: Hi-NRG
- Length: 3:54
- Label: MCA
- Songwriters: Ricky Wilde; Marty Wilde
- Producer: Ricky Wilde

Kim Wilde singles chronology
"House of Salome" (1984)	"The Second Time" (1984)	"The Touch" (1984)

Music video
- "The Second Time" on YouTube

"The Second Time" is the first single from the English singer Kim Wilde's fourth studio album, Teases & Dares (1984). In North America, the song was renamed "Go for It". The track was Wilde's first release through MCA Records. Her last few releases on her original label had failed to make an impact commercially, but this one returned her to the charts of several European countries, peaking at No. 29 on the UK singles chart. It also marked her second chart entry on the US Billboard Hot 100, where it peaked at No. 65. The B-side, "Lovers on a Beach" (an exclusive non-album track), was extended for the 12-inch single in some nations.

== Critical reception ==
In a September 1984 review Vici MacDonald of Smash Hits noticed that Ricky and Marty Wilde "always manage to build a classic little pop song around Kim's vulnerable falsetto" but bearing in mind the secondary nature of such material she summarised "I’ve got most of her singles, but it's a sad fact that they were all found in bargain bins."

== Track listings ==
All tracks were written by Ricky Wilde and Marty Wilde.

7-inch vinyl

- UK: MCA Records/KIM1
- Germany: WEA/259 281-7
- US: MCA Records/MCA-52513 (special limited edition poster sleeve)
1. "The Second Time" (US title: "Go for It") – 3:45
2. "Lovers on a Beach" – 3:50

12-inch vinyl

- UK: MCA Records/KIM1T
- Germany: MCA Records/259 281-0
1. "The Second Time" (extended version) – 6:30
2. "Lovers on a Beach" (extended version) – 7:45

US 12-inch vinyl

- US: MCA Records MCA-23533
1. "Go for It" (extended dance version) – 7:17
2. "Go for It" (dub version) – 9:32

== Charts ==
Chart (1984–1985)	Peak position
Belgium (Ultratop 50 Flanders)	15
Europe (European Top 100 Singles)	13
Luxembourg (Radio Luxembourg)	19
Netherlands (Dutch Top 40)	24
Netherlands (Single Top 100)	23
Switzerland (Schweizer Hitparade)	7
UK Singles (Official Charts)	29
US Billboard Hot 100	65
US Hot Dance/Disco (Billboard)	31
West Germany (GfK)	9
