= Now & Forever (Kim Wilde album) =

Studio album by Kim Wilde
- Released: 30 October 1995
- Recorded: 1994–1995
- Genres: Pop; R&B; dance
- Label: MCA
- Producers: Ricky Wilde; C.J. Mackintosh; Serious Rope

Kim Wilde chronology
The Singles Collection 1981–1993 (1993)	Now & Forever (1995)	The Very Best of Kim Wilde (2001)

Singles from Now & Forever
- 1. "Breakin' Away" Released: 25 September 1995; 2. "This I Swear" Released: 29 January 1996

Now & Forever is the ninth studio album by the English pop singer Kim Wilde, released on 30 October 1995 by MCA Records.

== Background ==
After three albums featuring a consistent pop sound, Wilde decided it was time for another change and chose to make an album with a decided soul/R&B feel to it. Ricky Wilde still produced, but joined forces with CJ Mackintosh for four of the album's tracks and co-produced with the Serious Rope team for seven others.

Opening with "Breakin' Away", an obvious dance track, and including R&B tracks like "C'mon Love Me", "You're All I Wanna Do" and "Where Do You Go From Here", the album was a departure from the familiar Wilde sound and didn't please fans and audience. It was her first album not to chart in the UK, and Radio One refused to add "Breakin' Away" to its airplay lists. The album was a daring move for Wilde, who wanted to make something to please herself first and foremost. Her interest in music by artists such as Chaka Khan and Pebbles heavily influenced the album.

Lyrically, the songs were either very happy ("Sweet Inspiration", "Heaven", "High on You") or bordering on depression ("Now & Forever", "Hold On"). Two singles were released in the UK, "Breakin' Away" and the second being "This I Swear", a dubious choice given the array of more radio-friendly songs on the album. The flip-side, "Heaven", was remixed twice (once mix by Matt Darey) and helped sales, but "This I Swear" stalled at No. 46 in early 1996.

Now & Forever was Wilde's last album before she started working in the musical Tommy and wound down her pop career. During the twelve-month run of the play, she remixed and released a version of the disco track "Shame", which had been recorded in the Now & Forever sessions but not included on the album.

== Critical response ==
Professional ratings
Review scores
Source	Rating
Allmusic	link
Music & Media	Positive
Music Week	3/5 stars
Q	2/5 stars

Music & Media commented, "A true bonanza of ACE nuggets are offered on this album. The collection of US-style R&B tunes with grand production contains at least five solid airplay candidates. The ballads C'mon Love Me and Hypnotise are perfect shimmering beauties. The midtempo number True To You as well as uptempo dance tracks Heaven and Breakin' Away combine R&B elegance with tight garage house rhythms." Music Week wrote, "Kim has come a long way since Kids In America and, now in her disco diva phase, she offers a soulful enough selection." Critic David Quantick in Q described Wilde's voice as "more likable than impressive" and wrote she adapts "to prevailing trends like a blank canvas". Comparing the album to the recent work of Kylie Minogue, Quantick notes: "Wilde has taken on the trappings of swingbeat, soft soul and jazziness; unlike the Australian, she's done so with convincing songs, invested with enough charisma to make them hers.". "This I Swear" was described as "slight but melodic and charming" while the "eminently catchy" and "gutsy" "High on You" was compared to the work of Five Star.

== Track listing ==
1. "Breakin' Away" (Tracy Ackerman, Tim Lever, Michael David Percy) - 3:37
2. "High on You" (Kim Wilde, Ricky Wilde) - 4:32
3. "This I Swear" (Pam Sheyne, Tony Swain) - 4:24
4. "C'mon Love Me" (Kim Wilde, George McFarlane) - 5:32
5. "True to You" (Kim Wilde, David James) - 4:56
6. "Hypnotise" (Kim Wilde, Ricky Wilde) - 4:49
7. "Heaven" (Kim Wilde, Ricky Wilde) - 3:50
8. "Sweet Inspiration" (Juliette Jaimes, Mark Jaimes, Steve Welton-Jaimes) - 3:51
9. "Where Do You Go from Here" (Kim Wilde, Ricky Wilde, Ralph Tancredi, Peter Zizzo) - 4:33
10. "Hold On" (Kim Wilde, Tony Swain) - 5:35
11. "You're All I Wanna Do" (Arnie Roman, Peter Zizzo) - 4:03
12. "Life & Soul" (Kim Wilde, Tony Swain) - 4:33
13. "Now & Forever" (Kim Wilde, George McFarlane) - 5:09
14. "Back to Heaven" (Kim Wilde, Ricky Wilde) - 1:42
15. "Staying with My Baby" (Japanese bonus track) - 4:28

== Charts ==
Chart (1995)	Peak position
Swiss Albums (Schweizer Hitparade)	37

Chart (2024)	Peak position
Scottish Albums (Official Charts)	89
UK Independent Albums (Official Charts)	27
UK Album Sales Chart(OCC)	54
