= Heart over Mind (Kim Wilde song) =

1992 single by Kim Wilde

"Heart Over Mind"

Single by Kim Wilde

from the album Love Is
- B-side: "I've Found a Reason"
- Released: 15 June 1992
- Length: 4:07 (album version); 3:48 (7-inch version)
- Label: MCA
- Songwriters: David Munday; Sandy Stewart; John Hall; Nick Whitecross
- Producer: Ricki Wilde

Kim Wilde singles chronology
"Love Is Holy" (1992)	"Heart Over Mind" (1992)	"Who Do You Think You Are?" (1992)

Music video
- "Heart over Mind" on YouTube

"Heart Over Mind" is the second single from English pop singer Kim Wilde's eighth studio album, Love Is (1992), and was released exclusively in the UK on 15 June 1992 by MCA Records. It was the final track to be recorded for the album. The original album version was edited for the 7-inch single release and extended for the CD single. The B-side is a non-album track called "I've Found a Reason", and the CD single also featured an extended version of "Touched by Your Magic" from Love Is. "Heart Over Mind" became Wilde's 19th UK top-40 hit.

== Track listings ==
- 7-inch: MCA / KIM 16 (UK)
1. "Heart over Mind" – 3:45
2. "I've Found a Reason" – 4:05
- CD: MCA / KIMTD 16 (UK)
1. "Heart over Mind" – 3:45
2. "I've Found a Reason" – 4:05
3. "Heart over Mind" (extended version) – 6:35
4. "Touched by Your Magic" (extended version) – 6:43
- CD: MCA / KIMXD 16 (UK)
1. "Heart over Mind" (7-inch version) – 3:45
2. "Love Is Holy" (7-inch version) – 4:01
3. "You Keep Me Hangin' On" (7-inch version) – 4:12
4. "Heart over Mind" (extended version) – 6:35

== Charts ==
Chart (1992)	Peak position
UK Singles (OCC)	34
UK Airplay (Music Week)	50
