= House of Salome =

Single by Kim Wilde

from the album Catch as Catch Can
- B-side: "Sing It Out For Love"
- Released: 30 January 1984
- Recorded: 1983
- Genre: Pop; disco; hi-NRG
- Length: 3:36
- Label: RAK
- Songwriters: Ricky Wilde, Marty Wilde
- Producer: Ricky Wilde

Kim Wilde singles chronology
"Dancing in the Dark" (1983)	"House of Salome" (1984)	"The Second Time" (1984)

"House of Salome" is the third and final single from the Kim Wilde album Catch as Catch Can.

It was not released in the UK or North America, but was issued in several other European countries, though did not meet with success. The single would mark her last original release with RAK Records. It features Gary Barnacle on saxophone and flute.

"House of Salome" is also one of only two commercially released Kim Wilde singles not to be issued in any country on the 12" format (the other being "Water on Glass").

== Song ==
The track is strong with a driving beat and intense lyrics. It deals with a mysterious figure by the name of Salome.

== Charts ==
Chart (1984)	Peak position
Belgium (Ultratop Flanders)	36
