= Supernaut (album) =

Studio album by Supernaut
- Released: November 1976
- Recorded: April–October 1976
- Studios: Armstrong Studios and Phonogram Recordings Pty.
- Genre: Glam rock
- Label: Polydor Records
- Producers: Tony Cohen, Supernaut

Supernaut chronology
Supernaut (1976)	The Nauts (1979)

Singles from Supernaut
- 1. "I Like It Both Ways" Released: May 1976; 2. "Too Hot to Touch" Released: September 1976

Supernaut is the debut studio album by Australian glam rock band Supernaut. The album was released in November 1976 and peaked at number 13 on the Australian Kent Music Report.

The album sold 8,000 copies on the day of release and sold over 50,000 by the end of 1976, to be certified gold in Australia.

== Track listing ==
LP/Cassette (2907 029)

Side A
No.	Title	Writer(s)	Length
1.	"Living a Lie"	Chris Burnham, Joe Burnham, Gary Twinn	4:40
2.	"Too Hot to Touch"	Burnham, Burhnam, Twinn	3:58
3.	"Space Angel"	Burnham, Burhnam, Twinn	4:07
4.	"Mountain Song"	Burnham, Burhnam, Twinn	5:37

Side B
No.	Title	Writer(s)	Length
1.	"Contacts"	Burnham, Burhnam, Twinn	4:17
2.	"I Like It Both Ways"	Burnham, Burhnam, Twinn	3:45
3.	"Mover"	Burnham, Burhnam, Twinn	4:30
4.	"Left Over Ladies"	Burnham, Burhnam, Twinn	5:10
5.	"Goodbye"	Burnham, Burhnam, Twinn	2:54

== Chart ==
Chart (1976/77)	Peak position
Australian Kent Music Report Albums Chart	13
