= Who Do You Think You Are (Kim Wilde song) =

1992 single by Kim Wilde

"Who Do You Think You Are?"

Single by Kim Wilde

from the album Love Is
- B-side: "I've Found a Reason"; "Try Again" (club mix)
- Released: 13 July 1992
- Genre: Pop
- Length: 3:47 (album version); 3:44 (7-inch version)
- Label: MCA
- Songwriter(s): Kim Wilde; Ricky Wilde
- Producer(s): Ricky Wilde

Kim Wilde singles chronology
"Heart Over Mind" (1992)	"Who Do You Think You Are?" (1992)	"Million Miles Away" (1992)

Music video
- "Who Do You Think You Are" on YouTube

"Who Do You Think You Are?" is the third single from English singer Kim Wilde's eighth studio album, Love Is (1992). The previous single, "Heart Over Mind", had only been released in the United Kingdom, making this the second international single. The song was remixed from its original album form for its release, and several longer remixes are included on the 12-inch and CD single formats. A remix of "Try Again" from Love Is was used as the B-side in the UK while other countries used "I've Found a Reason", an exclusive non-album track, previously used as the B-side to "Heart Over Mind". A remix of "Heart Over Mind" also appears on the UK CD single.

== Critical reception ==
Lennox Herald described the song as "bright, breezy pop" in their review.

== Music video ==
A music video was made to accompany the song, directed by Greg Masuak. It was published on YouTube in September 2013. By November 2020, the video has been viewed over 864 000 times.

== Track listings ==
- 7-inch
1. "Who Do You Think You Are?" – 3:46
2. "Try Again" (club mix) – 4:29
- CD 1
1. "Who Do You Think You Are?" (7-inch version) – 3:46
2. "Try Again" (club mix) – 4:29
3. "Who Do You Think You Are?" (Bruce Forest 12-inch mix) – 7:56
4. "Who Do You Think You Are?" (Bruce Forest dub mix) – 5:31
- CD 2
1. "Who Do You Think You Are?" (7-inch version) – 3:46
2. "Who Do You Think You Are?" (extended version) – 5:38
3. "Heart Over Mind" (club mix) – 4:28
4. "Never Trust A Stranger" (7-inch version) – 4:05

== Charts ==
Chart (1992)	Peak position
Germany (GfK)	58
Netherlands (Dutch Top 40 Tipparade)	10
Netherlands (Single Top 100)	66
UK Singles (OCC)	49

== Release history ==
Region	Date	Format(s)	Label(s)	Ref.
Europe	13 July 1992	7-inch vinyl	MCA	
Australia	24 August 1992	CD; cassette	MCA	
United Kingdom	31 August 1992	7-inch vinyl; CD; cassette	MCA	
