= The Nauts =

Studio album by the Nauts
- Released: 1979
- Recorded: 1978–1979
- Genre: Rock; new wave
- Label: Wizard

The Nauts chronology
Supernaut (1976)	The Nauts (1979)	I Like It Both Ways (1995)

Singles from The Nauts
- 1. "Spies" Released: December 1978; 2. "Black Market World" Released: September 1979

The Nauts is the second and final studio album by Australian glam rock band the Nauts (formerly known as Supernaut). The album was released in 1979 by Wizard Records.

== Track listing ==
LP/cassette (ZL 000)

Side A
No.	Title	Writer(s)	Length
1.	"Black Market World"	Chris Burnham, Phillip Foxman, Gary Twinn, Joe Burnham	3:42
2.	"Joe Public"	Chris Burnham, Phillip Foxman, Gary Twinn, Joe Burnham	2:59
3.	"Spies"	Chris Burnham, Phillip Foxman, Gary Twinn, Joe Burnham	2:54
4.	"Silent Running"	Chris Burnham, Phillip Foxman, Gary Twinn, Joe Burnham	2:54
5.	"Crazy Man"	Chris Burnham, Phillip Foxman, Gary Twinn, Joe Burnham	2:11
6.	"Soldiers"	Chris Burnham, Phillip Foxman, Gary Twinn, Joe Burnham	2:27

Side B
No.	Title	Writer(s)	Length
1.	"America"	Chris Burnham, Phillip Foxman, Gary Twinn, Joe Burnham	3:53
2.	"Dont Wanna Be Like You"	Chris Burnham, Phillip Foxman, Gary Twinn, Joe Burnham	3:08
3.	"Enemies"	Chris Burnham, Phillip Foxman, Gary Twinn, Joe Burnham	2:18
4.	"Modern Man"	Chris Burnham, Phillip Foxman, Gary Twinn, Joe Burnham	2:27
5.	"Angry Young Man"	Chris Burnham, Phillip Foxman, Gary Twinn, Joe Burnham	4:19
6.	"1000 Mph"	Chris Burnham, Phillip Foxman, Gary Twinn, Joe Burnham	1:30
7.	"000"	Chris Burnham, Phillip Foxman, Gary Twinn, Joe Burnham	3:55
