= Love Is (Kim Wilde album) =

Studio album by Kim Wilde
- Released: 18 May 1992
- Recorded: 1991–1992
- Studio: Select Sound Studios (Knebworth, England); Larrabee Sound Studios (Hollywood, California)
- Genre: Pop
- Label: MCA
- Producer: Rick Nowels; Ricky Wilde

Kim Wilde chronology
Love Moves (1990)	Love Is (1992)	The Singles Collection 1981–1993 (1993)

Singles from Love Is
- 1. "Love Is Holy" Released: 20 April 1992; 2. "Heart over Mind" Released: 15 June 1992; 3. "Who Do You Think You Are?" Released: 13 July 1992; 4. "Million Miles Away" Released: 2 November 1992

Love Is is the eighth studio album by Kim Wilde, released in spring 1992. The album was not released in North America.

Kim Wilde found herself working with Rick Nowels on this album, the same songwriter who had written for Belinda Carlisle and later for Madonna amongst others. Three of the eleven tracks were produced by him while the remaining eight were produced by Ricky Wilde.

The majority of the tracks on this album were co-written by Wilde. In the song "Who Do You Think You Are", she reflects on how she had behaved through the years in her career. There were more love songs on this album; titles such as "Touched by Your Magic" and "Heart over Mind" are an indication of the themes of the lyrics.

Nowels provided "Love Is Holy", a song that immediately struck a chord with Wilde when she heard it in his studio in America. It became the first single release, giving Wilde her first UK Top 20 hit in nearly four years. Although the following two singles fell short of equalling its success, the project as a whole was well received by critics, who noted the Belinda Carlisle connection in some tracks. The rest of the album, however, was more consistent with the Wilde sound: guitar riffs over synths. Overall, the sound is more introspective and organic than the commercial pop of Love Moves, and especially haunting was the closing track, "Too Late", in which the loss of love is described in mournful tones. Mick Karn was credited for the bass on "Try Again".

== Critical response ==
Tim Marsh of Q described "Love Is Holy" as "by far the strongest here" and was positive about mid-tempo tracks such as "Touched by Your Magic" in which Wilde demonstrates the range of her voice.

== Track listing ==
Standard edition
No.	Title	Writer(s)	Length
1.	"Love Is Holy"	Rick Nowels; Ellen Shipley	4:03
2.	"Who Do You Think You Are"	Kim Wilde; Ricky Wilde	3:48
3.	"I Believe in You"	R. Wilde; Mick Silver	4:08
4.	"Touched by Your Magic"	R. Wilde; Silver	4:36
5.	"I Won't Change the Way That I Feel"	K. Wilde; Nowels	4:07
6.	"Million Miles Away"	K. Wilde; R. Wilde	4:08
7.	"The Light of the Moon (Belongs to Me)"	K. Wilde; R. Wilde; Steve Byrd	4:15
8.	"Heart over Mind"	John Hall; David Munday; Sandy Stewart; Nicholas Whitecross	4:07
9.	"A Miracle's Coming"	K. Wilde; R. Wilde; Nowels	4:00
10.	"Try Again"	K. Wilde; R. Wilde	4:23
11.	"Too Late"	K. Wilde; Byrd	3:59

2024 vinyl picture disc (bonus tracks)
No.	Title	Writer(s)	Length
6.	"I've Found a Reason"
7.	"In My Life"
8.	"Million Miles Away"	K. Wilde; R. Wilde
9.	"The Light of the Moon (Belongs to Me)"	K. Wilde; R. Wilde; Byrd
10.	"Heart over Mind"	Hall; Munday; Stewart; Whitecross
11.	"A Miracle's Coming"	K. Wilde; R. Wilde; Nowels
12.	"Try Again"	K. Wilde; R. Wilde
13.	"Too Late"	K. Wilde; Byrd
14.	"If I Can't Have You"

2024 expanded deluxe CD edition (disc one bonus tracks)
No.	Title	Length
12.	"Birthday Song"
13.	"I've Found a Reason"
14.	"If I Can't Have You"
15.	"In My Life"
16.	"Never Felt so Alive"
17.	"One Door Closes"
18.	"Heart over Mind" (7" Version)
19.	"Who Do You Think You Are" (7" Version)

2024 expanded deluxe edition (disc two)
No.	Title	Length
1.	"Love Is Holy" (Alternative Mix)
2.	"Million Miles Away" (7" Version)
3.	"If I Can't Have You" (Original Mix)
4.	"In My Life" (Lifestyle Mix)
5.	"Heart over Mind" (Extended Version)
6.	"Who Do You Think You Are" (Extended Version)
7.	"Touched by Your Magic" (Extended Version)
8.	"I Believe in You" (Extended Version)
9.	"The Light of the Moon (Belongs to Me)" (Alternative Mix)
10.	"Love Is Holy" (Ambient Mix)
11.	"Million Miles Away" (Club Mix)
12.	"Try Again" (Club Mix)
13.	"Heart over Mind" (Club Mix)
14.	"If I Can't Have You" (Extended Version)
15.	"In My Life" (Get a Life Mix)

2024 expanded deluxe edition (disc three)
No.	Title	Length
1.	"Love Is Holy" (Rough Mix)
2.	"A Miracle's Coming" (Rough Mix)
3.	"I Won't Change the Way That I Feel" (Rough Mix)
4.	"In My Life" (West End 7")
5.	"Who Do You Think You Are" (Bruce Forest Remix Edit)
6.	"If I Can't Have You" (Kelsey Mix)
7.	"In My Life" (West End 12" Remix)
8.	"Who Do You Think You Are" (Bruce Forest 12" Mix)
9.	"If I Can't Have You" (Made in Japan)
10.	"In My Life" (West End 12" Radio Edit)
11.	"Who Do You Think You Are" (Bruce Forest Dub Mix)
12.	"In My Life" (Dub Mix)
13.	"If I Can't Have You" (Dub Mix)
14.	"In My Life" (West End D'oomy Dub)
15.	"If I Can't Have You" (John Robinson Instrumental)
16.	"In My Life" (Wilde Groovy)

2024 expanded deluxe edition (disc four – DVD)
No.	Title	Length
1.	"Love Is Holy" (Promo Video)
2.	"Heart over Mind" (Promo Video)
3.	"Who Do You Think You Are" (Promo Video)
4.	"Million Miles Away" (Promo Video)
5.	"If I Can't Have You" (Promo Video)
6.	"In My Life" (Promo Video)
7.	"If I Can't Have You" (Extended 12" Version) (Promo Video)
8.	"Love Is Holy" (Live on Wogan)
9.	"Love Is Holy" (Live on Tricks 'n' Tracks)
10.	"Love Is Holy" (Live on Pebble Mill)
11.	"Love Is Holy" (Live on Top of the Pops)
12.	"Heart over Mind" (Live on Summer Scene)
13.	"If I Can't Have You" (Live on Top of the Pops)
14.	"In My Life" (Live on Pebble Mill)
15.	"Four Letter Word" (Live on Pebble Mill)
16.	"In My Life" (Live on Family Affairs)
17.	"Behind-the-Scenes & Interview Footage"
18.	"Love Is EPK"
19.	"The Making of "Love Is Holy""
20.	"The Making of "Heart over Mind""
21.	"The Making of "Million Miles Away""
22.	"The Making of "If I Can't Have You""

== Personnel ==
=== Musicians ===
- Kim Wilde – lead and backing vocals
- Charles Judge – keyboards (1, 5, 9)
- Ricky Wilde – keyboards (2, 3, 4, 6, 7, 8, 10, 11), programming (2, 3, 4, 6, 7, 8, 10, 11), guitars (2, 6), bass (2, 3, 4, 6, 7, 11), backing vocals (4, 8, 10)
- David Munday – keyboards (8), programming (8), guitars (8), backing vocals (8)
- Rusty Anderson – guitars (1, 5, 9)
- Steve Byrd – guitars (3, 4, 6, 10, 11)
- Davey Johnstone – mandolin (5), sitar (5)
- John Pierce – bass (5, 9)
- Mick Karn – bass (10)
- Curt Bisquera – drums (1)
- Geoff Dugmore – drums (2, 7, 10, 11)
- Rudy Richman – drums (5, 9)
- Rick Nowels – arrangements (1, 5, 9)
- Paul Buckmaster – string arrangements and conductor (5)
- Valerie Pinkston – backing vocals (1, 5, 9)
- Frances Ruffelle – backing vocals (1, 5, 9)
- Ellen Shipley – backing vocals (1, 5, 9)
- Junior Giscombe – backing vocals (4)
- Jordan Bailey – backing vocals (6)
- Roxanne Wilde – backing vocals (7)

=== Production ===
- Rick Nowels – producer (1, 5, 9)
- Ricky Wilde – producer (2, 3, 4, 6, 7, 8, 10, 11), mixing (2, 3, 4, 6, 7, 8, 10, 11)
- Kevin W. Smith – engineer (1, 5, 9)
- James Richards – engineer (2, 3, 4, 6, 7, 8, 10, 11), mixing (4)
- Stephen Steater – engineer (2, 3, 4, 6, 7, 8, 10, 11)
- John Kovorek – additional engineer (1, 5, 9)
- Greg Grill – assistant engineer (1)
- Darian Sahanaja – assistant engineer (5, 9)
- Steve MacMillan – mixing (1, 5, 9)
- John Chamberlain – mix assistant (1, 5, 9)
- Tony Swain – mixing (2, 3, 4, 6, 7, 8, 10, 11)
- James Richards – mixing (4)
- Pete Schweir – mixing (8)
- Laura Harding – production coordinator (1, 5, 9)
- Sammy Farrington – art direction, design
- Zanna – photography
- Sam McKnight – hair stylist
- Dick Page – make-up

== Charts ==
=== Weekly charts ===
1992 weekly chart performance for Love Is
Chart (1992)	Peak position
Australian Albums (ARIA)	92
Austrian Albums (Ö3 Austria)	22
Danish Albums (Hitlisten)	7
Dutch Albums (Album Top 100)	53
European Albums (Music & Media)	43
French Albums (IFOP)	36
German Albums (Offizielle Top 100)	42
Swedish Albums (Sverigetopplistan)	25
Swiss Albums (Schweizer Hitparade)	7
UK Albums (OCC)	21

2024 weekly chart performance for Love Is
Chart (2024)	Peak position
Belgian Albums (Ultratop Flanders)	151
Scottish Albums (OCC)	49
UK Album Sales (OCC)	38
UK Independent Albums (OCC)	18

=== Year-end charts ===
Year-end chart performance for Love Is
Chart (1992)	Position
Swiss Albums (Schweizer Hitparade)	40

== Certifications and sales ==
Sales and certifications for Love Is
Region	Certification	Certified units/sales
Sweden (GLF)	Gold	50,000^{^}
Switzerland (IFPI Switzerland)	Gold	25,000^{^}
^{^} Shipments figures based on certification alone.
