= Million Miles Away (Kim Wilde song) =

Single by Kim Wilde

from the album Love Is
- B-side: "The Light of the Moon (Belongs to Me)"
- Released: 2 November 1992
- Genre: Pop
- Length: 4:07 (Album Version); 4:13 (7" Version)
- Label: MCA
- Songwriters: Kim Wilde, Ricki Wilde
- Producer: Ricki Wilde

Kim Wilde singles chronology
"Who Do You Think You Are" (1992)	"Million Miles Away" (1992)	"If I Can't Have You" (1993)

Music video
- "Million Miles Away" on YouTube

"Million Miles Away" is the fourth and final single from Kim Wilde's 1992 album Love Is, released only in continental Europe, Australia and Japan. The track was remixed from its original album form for its single release. An extended club mix was also used for the 12" and CD-single formats. In Australia, "Million Miles Away" was released on 16 November 1992, and peaked at number 154 on the ARIA singles chart.
