= Love Moves =

Studio album by Kim Wilde
- Released: 14 May 1990
- Recorded: 1989–1990
- Studios: Select Sound Studios (Knebworth, England); RAK Studios (London, UK)
- Genre: Pop · dance-pop · synth-pop
- Label: MCA
- Producer: Ricky Wilde

Kim Wilde chronology
Close (1988)	Love Moves (1990)	Love Is (1992)

Singles from Love Moves
- 1. "It's Here" Released: 2 April 1990; 2. "Time" Released: 4 June 1990; 3. "Can't Get Enough (Of Your Love)" Released: June 1990 (France), August 1990 (Germany), 13 August 1990 (Australia); 4. "I Can't Say Goodbye" Released: 3 December 1990; 5. "World in Perfect Harmony" Released: 21 January 1991

Professional ratings
Review scores
Source	Rating
Encyclopedia of Popular Music	2/5 stars
Hitkrant	(favorable)
Melody Maker	(favorable)
New Musical Express	7/10
Q	2/5 stars
Record Mirror	1.5/5 stars
Select	2/5 stars

Love Moves is the seventh studio album by the English pop singer Kim Wilde, released on 14 May 1990 by MCA Records. The album was not released in North America.

This was the first album by Wilde to yield no top 40 hit singles in the UK; "Time", the second release from the album, was the lowest charting single in her discography at that time. Five singles in total were released across Europe, with "It's Here", the album's lead single, becoming a top 20 hit in Scandinavian countries and "Can't Get Enough" making a top 20 entry and long run on the French singles chart, where the album sold over 155 000 copies.

The album attempted to capitalize on the success of Wilde's previous album, Close (1988), but although a top 10 album in Scandinavian countries, it failed to sell as strongly as its predecessor. Some critics noted the MOR feel of the album and the use of similar production sounds throughout. It includes guests Jaki Graham, who contributed backing vocals, and Deon Estus, playing bass guitar. Wilde herself believed "it was a very strong album, and it was very disappointing that it didn't do well. But it didn't really come as too much of a big surprise, because my career before then had always been very up and down. So it wasn't a complete shock... but it was very disappointing."

== Critical response ==
Love Moves received mostly mixed reviews from contemporary critics. Colin Irwan of Smash Hits, despite referring to Wilde as "one of pop's more welcome survivors", accused the singer of "underselling" herself. Describing "It's Here" as "characterless" and the album itself as containing "featherweight production and unimaginative material", some praise was given to "Time" (which was compared to the work of Belinda Carlisle) and "In Hollywood" (featuring a "Madonna-esque sense of drama"). Q described the album as a disappointment, writing of Wilde's "character-free voice" and the "EEC approved variants of what once might have been considered a lightly soulful persuasion" found on "Time" and "Who's to Blame".

== Track listing ==
All tracks composed by Kim Wilde and Ricky Wilde; except where indicated.

1. "It's Here" – 3:36
2. "Love (Send Him Back to Me)" (Tony Swain) – 4:32
3. "Storm in Our Hearts" (Tony Swain) – 5:09
4. "World in Perfect Harmony" – 3:53
5. "Someday" – 4:49
6. "Time" – 4:11
7. "Who's to Blame" (Tony Swain) – 3:48
8. "Can't Get Enough (Of Your Love)" – 4:00
9. "In Hollywood" (Tony Swain) – 4:17
10. "I Can't Say Goodbye" – 5:01

== Personnel ==
- Kim Wilde – lead and backing vocals
- Ricky Wilde – keyboards, programming
- Tony Swain – additional keyboards (2, 3, 7, 9), additional programming (2, 3, 7, 9)
- Steve Byrd – guitars (1, 4, 8, 10)
- Deon Estus – bass (10)
- Danny Cummings – percussion (9)
- Richard Niles – string arrangements (10)

== Production ==
- Ricky Wilde – producer, mixing
- Jimmy Jazz – engineer, mixing
- Stephen Streater – assistant engineer
- Three Associates (3a) – album design
- Johnnie Rutter – photography

== Charts ==
Chart (1990)	Peak position
Australian Albums (ARIA)	126
Dutch Albums (Album Top 100)	39
European Albums (Music & Media)	36
Finnish Albums (Suomen virallinen lista)	18
German Albums (Offizielle Top 100)	24
Italian Albums (FIMI)	70
Norwegian Albums (VG-lista)	10
Swedish Albums (Sverigetopplistan)	10
Swiss Albums (Schweizer Hitparade)	12
UK Albums (Official Charts)	37

Chart (2024)	Peak position
Scottish Albums (Official Charts)	63
UK Independent Albums (Official Charts)	22
UK Album Sales Chart(OCC)	43

== Certifications ==
Region	Certification	Certified units/sales
Switzerland (IFPI Switzerland)	Gold	25,000^{^}
^{^} Shipments figures based on certification alone.

== Bibliography ==
- Love Moves at AllMusic
