= Breakin' Away (song) =

Single by Kim Wilde

from the album Now & Forever
- B-side: "Staying with my Baby"
- Released: 25 September 1995
- Genre: Pop; house; dance; disco
- Length: 3:36
- Label: MCA
- Songwriters: Tracy Ackerman; M. Percy; T. Lever
- Producers: Ricki Wilde; Serious Rope

Kim Wilde singles chronology
"Kids in America 1994" (1994)	"Breakin' Away" (1995)	"This I Swear" (1996)

Music video
- "Breakin' Away" on YouTube

"Breakin' Away" is a song by the English singer Kim Wilde, released in September 1995 by MCA Records as the first single from her ninth album, Now & Forever (1995). Wilde had initially made her name in the 1980s as the highest-selling British female soloist of that decade. She had also earned some degree of success in the early 1990s. "Breakin' Away" was written by Tracy Ackerman, M. Percy and T. Lever, and produced by Ricki Wilde and Serious Rope. It was released both in its original form and as several different extended remixes on the 12" and CD-single formats. On the CD and cassette single, a song called "Staying with My Baby" was also included. This track was somewhat exclusive as it was only included on the Japanese issue of the Now & Forever album.

== Critical reception ==
Larry Flick from Billboard magazine commented, "It has been awhile since the seemingly ageless Kim Wilde delivered a single as good as her U.K. single, 'Breakin' Away'. Under the production guidance of brother Ricki Wilde and the ever-fab Serious Rope, she is the picture of sweet, girlish charm, gleefully romping through the track's plush retro-disco arrangement." Pan-European magazine Music & Media wrote, "This fast-moving dance track introduces us to an up-to-date Kim Wilde. She lets the world know that we've got to move forward and that's exactly what she's doing with this single, which should be welcomed by dance and EHR stations." A reviewer from Music Week noted, "Anyone else on vocals and this marshmallow pop could pass unnoticed, but the massive past success of Wilde should see her getting a chart slot." James Hamilton from the Record Mirror Dance Update described it as a "breezily harmonized romping chunky strider – sorta Madonna meets Manhattan Transfer" in his weekly dance column.

== Track listing ==
- CD single, Europe (1995)
1. "Breakin' Away" (Radio Mix) – 3:35
2. "Breakin' Away" (Original 12" Mix) – 6:29
3. "Breakin' Away" (Matt Darey Vocal Mix) – 6:15
4. "Staying with My Baby" (Radio Mix) – 4:28

== Charts ==
Chart (1995)	Peak positions
Australia (ARIA)	147
Germany (GfK)	79
Netherlands (Dutch Top 40 Tipparade)	11
Netherlands (Dutch Single Tip)	14
Scotland (OCC)	53
UK Singles (OCC)	43
