= I Can't Say Goodbye =

Single by Kim Wilde

from the album Love Moves
- B-side: "Sanjazz Megamix"
- Released: 3 December 1990
- Genre: Pop
- Length: 5:00 (album version); 4:12 (7" version)
- Label: MCA
- Songwriter(s): Kim Wilde; Ricki Wilde
- Producer(s): Ricki Wilde

Kim Wilde singles chronology
"Can't Get Enough (Of Your Love)" (1990)	"I Can't Say Goodbye" (1990)	"World in Perfect Harmony" (1991)

"I Can't Say Goodbye" is a song by British singer-songwriter Kim Wilde, released exclusively in the UK in December 1990 by MCA Records as the third UK single from her seventh album, Love Moves (1990). It is written by Wilde with her brother, Ricki Wilde who also produced it. The ballad, which featured backing vocals by Jaki Graham, was remixed and edited for the 7" and CD formats, whereas the original album version appears on the 12". The B-side was a megamix of some of Wilde's songs entitled "Sanjazz Megamix", an edit of which was used for the 7".

== Charts ==
Chart (1991)	Peak position
UK Singles (OCC)	51
UK Airplay (Music Week)	36
