= Just Can't Get Enough =

Just Can't Get Enough may refer to:

- "Just Can't Get Enough" (Black Eyed Peas song), 2011
- "Just Can't Get Enough" (Depeche Mode song), 1981
- Just Can't Get Enough: New Wave Hits of the '80s, a series of compilation albums
- "Just Can't Get Enough", a 1999 song by Harry Romero
- "Just Can't Get Enough (No No No No)", a 2001 song by Eye to Eye featuring Taka Boom

== See also ==
- Can't Get Enough (disambiguation)
