= Love Is Holy =

1992 single by Kim Wilde

Single by Kim Wilde

from the album Love Is
- B-side: "Birthday Song"
- Released: 20 April 1992
- Genre: Pop
- Length: 4:03
- Label: MCA
- Songwriters: Rick Nowels; Ellen Shipley
- Producer: Rick Nowels

Kim Wilde singles chronology
"World in Perfect Harmony" (1991)	"Love Is Holy" (1992)	"Heart over Mind" (1992)

Music video
- "Love Is Holy" on YouTube

"Love Is Holy" is a song by English singer Kim Wilde, released by MCA Records as the first single from her eighth album, Love Is (1992). It was written by American songwriting duo Rick Nowels and Ellen Shipley. Wilde travelled to Los Angeles to do three live tracks with Nowels, and during her time there, he played her "Love Is Holy", and she took to it instantly. They recorded it the following day and released it as a single in April 1992. The single reached the top 20 in several countries.

A remix subtitled "Ambient Mix" is included on the 12-inch and CD single formats, and the B-side of the single is a song called "Birthday Song", written by Wilde and her brother about his new daughter, Scarlett.

== Critical reception ==
Mike DeGagne from AllMusic described the song as "bright and lively" with a "typical yet congenial" pop melody. Pan-European magazine Music & Media wrote that Wilde "has given up the bombastic leanings on some of her most recent work in favour of a more direct guitars-upfront approach. They also called it a "poppy and Bangles-like tune". Simon Williams of NME noted that the track sees "Kim go for the shagfrenzy Belinda Carlisle approach".

== Track listings ==
- 7-inch: MCA / KIM 15 (UK)
1. "Love Is Holy" – 4:02
2. "Birthday Song" – 5:06
- 12-inch: MCA / KIMT 15 (UK)
1. "Love Is Holy" – 4:02
2. "Love Is Holy" (Ambient mix) – 4:43
3. "Birthday Song" – 5:06
- CD: MCA / KIMTD 15 (UK)
1. "Love Is Holy" – 4:02
2. "Birthday Song" – 5:06
3. "Love Is Holy" (Ambient mix) – 4:43
4. "You Came" (Shep Pettibone remix) – 7:37
- CD: MCD 18636
1. "Love Is Holy" – 4:02
2. "Birthday Song" – 5:06
3. "Love Is Holy" (Ambient mix) – 4:43

== Charts ==
Chart (1992)	Peak position
Australia (ARIA)	29
Austria (Ö3 Austria Top 40)	28
Belgium (Ultratop 50 Flanders)	23
Europe (Eurochart Hot 100)	46
France (SNEP)	40
Germany (GfK)	42
Ireland (IRMA)	26
Netherlands (Dutch Top 40)	18
Netherlands (Single Top 100)	21
Sweden (Sverigetopplistan)	39
Switzerland (Schweizer Hitparade)	13
UK Singles (OCC)	16
UK Airplay (Music Week)	7

== Release history ==
Region	Date	Format(s)	Label(s)	Ref.
United Kingdom	20 April 1992	7-inch vinyl; 12-inch vinyl; CD; cassette	MCA	
Australia	1 June 1992	CD; cassette	MCA	
Japan	21 June 1992	Mini-CD	MCA	
