= Twenty Flight Rockers =

English rock band

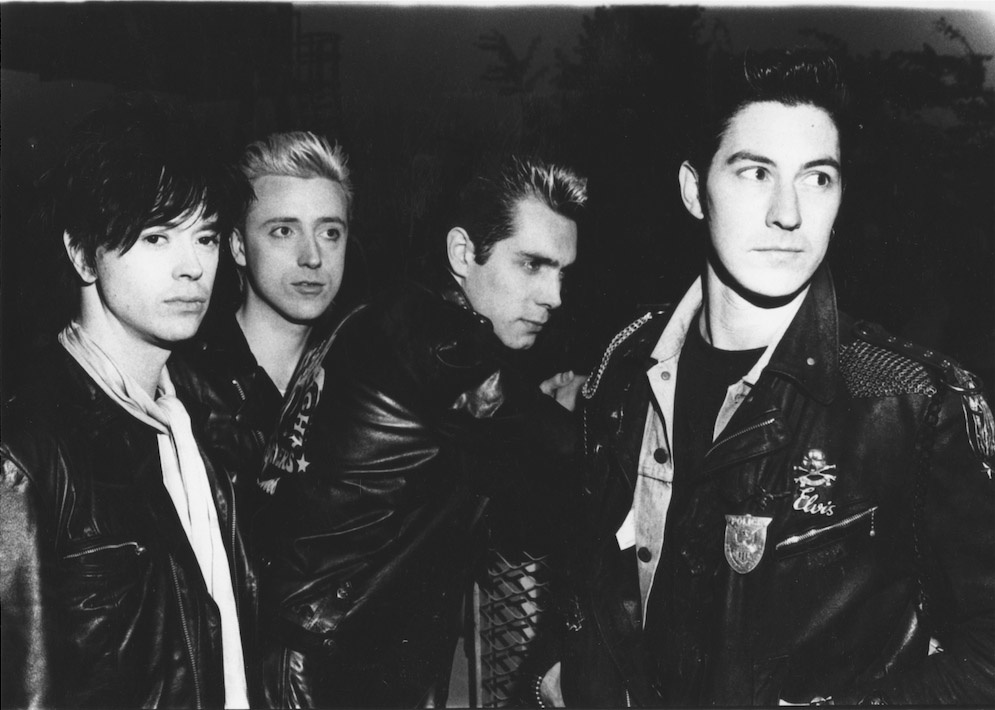
- Twenty Flight Rockers (1986)

Background information
- Origin: London, England, United Kingdom
- Genres: Rock; rock 'n' roll; rockabilly; punk rock
- Years active: 1983–1989, 2026
- Members: Gary Twinn; Mark Laff; Ian McKean; Simon Kitchener
- Past members: Jeff D. Vine; Danny B. Harvey; Steve Counsel
- Website: twentyflightrockers.com

Twenty Flight Rockers were a 1980s English rock music band, founded by the singer Gary Twinn, drummer Mark Laff, and the bassist Steve Counsel.

The band reunited in 2026.

== Career ==
The band was formed in London in 1983 by Gary Twinn, former singer/frontman of the Australian band Supernaut; the drummer Mark Laff, recently from the band Empire, and the former Puncture bass player Steve Counsel. Shortly after its commencement it recruited the lead guitarist Ian McKean. Counsel soon quit the new band to join The London Cowboys, and was replaced by the bass guitarist Jeff D. Vine.

Drawing inspiration from 1950's traditional Rock & Roll artists such as Eddie Cochran, Elvis Presley, Gene Vincent and Johnny Kidd, the new band named itself after the 1957 song Twenty Flight Rock, adopted a rocker style, and wrote old school Rock & Roll/Rockabilly music, blended slightly with a retro punk rock image.

The band played gigs in London, performing several dates at The Marquee Club and Mayfair Ballroom. They were subsequently invited to play the BBC's Janice Long show. The Janice Long show consisted of three tracks Tower Block Rock, Weekend Revolution & Making The Punishment Fit The Crime. On 7 July 1985 the band appeared at the free entry Greater London Council's "Jobs for a Change" music festival in Battersea Park, being driven off the stage by a barrage of bottles, beer-cans and traffic cones from the crowd within a couple of minutes of walking on.

In 1985 it released the single "Tower Block Rock" (ranked #31 for Best Single of the year in Rockerilla Magazine) with ABC Records, and in 1986 the single "Johnny 7" was released with WEA Records, but both records failed to enter the pop music charts. In March of that same year the song "Searching for a Hero", was given away for free on the Spools Gold compilation released on cassette with the Record Mirror Magazine.

The band performed at Richfield Avenue for the first day of the resumed Reading and Leeds Festivals on 22 August 1986.

The band’s original manager was Brian Atchinson. Atchinson negotiated the band’s original recording contract with Warner Brother Records and their live, national broadcast on BBC Radio (the first since the Beatles). In 1987 Bernie Rhodes was hired as the band's manager, and secured a contract for it with Epic Records. Rhodes also had McKean replaced by guitarist Danny B. Harvey. The band recorded a series of sessions (compiled by Twinn and Harvey) as well as a studio album entitled Ride. In 1988 the song "Black Leather Jacket" was released as a single promo (which again failed to chart), with the album's release due to follow in mid-1988. However, in the meantime Epic Records was bought out by Sony, which subsequently dropped the band from the label after a review of its newly acquired holding's acts. Unable to find another record label willing to sign them, Twenty Flight Rockers broke up in 1989.

On July 24, 2026, Twenty Flight Rockers announced their return for a London show at the 100 Club. They also revealed an archive live release of Live '85, a concert originally recorded at The Bull in East Sheen from July 6, 1985. With Gary Twinn, Mark Laff, and Ian McKean returning and Simon Kitchener filling in on bass guitar, the reunion show took place on October 30.

== Members ==
- Gary Twinn – lead vocals (1983-1989, 2026)
- Mark Laff – drums (1983-1989, 2026)
- Ian McKean – lead guitar, backing vocals (1983-1986, 2026)
- Simon Kitchener – bass, backing vocals (2026)
- Danny B. Harvey – lead guitar, backing vocals (1986-1989)
- Jeff D. Vine – bass, backing vocals (1983-1989)
- Steve Counsel – bass, backing vocals (1983)

== Discography ==
Albums

- 2001 – Twenty Flight Rockers (Revel Yell Music) (Originally recorded in 1988 as Ride.)
- 2004 – The New York Sessions 1988 (Revel Yell Music) (Originally recorded in 1988.)
- 2026 – Live '85 (MR Records) (Originally recorded in July 6, 1985.)

Singles & EPs

- 1985 – "Tower Block Rock" b/w "Weekend Revolution" (ABC Records) (7" version w/ "Tower Block Rock" marked at 3:26 for running time.)
- 1985 – "Tower Block Rock" b/w "Weekend Revolution" & "Young Man (Live)" (ABC Records) (12" version w/ "Tower Block Rock" marked at 5:50 for running time.)
- 1986 – "Johnny Seven" b/w "Tower Block Rock (W.1)" (WEA Records)
- 1988 – "Black Leather Jacket" b/w same track (Epic Records) (Promo demonstration only.)
- 2026 – Cool Baby – Maximum Rock’N’Roll EP (Cadiz Entertainment) (Limited only to 200 copies from the 2026 reunion show.)

Others

- 1986 – "Searching for a Hero" featured on the limited and rare Spools Gold cassette compilation. (Record Mirror Magazine)
- 2001 – "Guns 4 Sale (NY Sessions)" featured on the History Of Danny B. Harvey CD compilation. (Revel Yell Music) (Mislabeled as the studio version.)
- 2016 – "King of a Lonesome Road" & "We Are the Rockers" featured on the Danny B. Harvey: Rock 'n' Roll Guitar Hero compilation. (Naked Spurs Records)

== See also ==
- List of songs about London
- Reading and Leeds Festivals line-ups
