= Dancing in the Dark (Kim Wilde song) =

Single by Kim Wilde

from the album Catch as Catch Can
- B-side: "Back Street Driver"
- Released: 24 October 1983
- Recorded: 1983
- Genre: Synth-pop
- Length: 3:44; 5:24 (12" Remix)
- Label: RAK
- Songwriters: Nicky Chinn; Paul Gurvitz
- Producer: Ricky Wilde

Kim Wilde singles chronology
"Love Blonde" (1983)	"Dancing in the Dark" (1983)	"House of Salome" (1984)

"Dancing in the Dark" is a 1983 song by the English pop singer Kim Wilde, released as the second single from her third studio album, Catch as Catch Can (1983). The song marked a change in direction for the singer, with more of a dance-oriented style than her earlier work. It did not meet with the success of previous singles, only just scraping into the UK Top 75. Its peak at No. 67 was Wilde's lowest chart showing up to this point and would remain so until 1990's "Time". The single remains Wilde's final UK release with her original record label, RAK Records.

== Release and critical reception ==
The track was written by Nicky Chinn and Paul Gurvitz, making it only the second track Wilde recorded not written by her father and brother (the latter did, however, receive production credits). It was remixed by Nile Rodgers for the extended 12" release, which also included an instrumental version of the song. The B-side of the single was "Back Street Driver", an outtake from the Catch as Catch Can (1983) album sessions. A promotional music video was made for the single, which featured Wilde dressed in black and performing the song to camera, backed by a silhouetted black male dancer, who acts as her romantic interest. "Dancing in the Dark" received mixed reviews in the press, as did the album, with some commenting on the song's risqué lyrics, which detail a romantic encounter with a stranger.

Although it did make the top 30 in a number of European countries, Wilde considered this her "rock bottom" and was unhappy with the song.

"No-one expected that 'Dancing in the Dark' would do so badly. Every Monday I woke up in fear and asked my record company if the record had made the charts yet. They reacted coldly. Kim Wilde had disappointed her entourage. And I lost my self-confidence. No, it wasn't really a good song. My brother and father went through a less creative period. They own up to that now. And it can't be a success every time, of course. I still thought I'd failed though."

== Charts ==
Chart (1983)	Peak position
Denmark (IFPI)	3
Finland (Suomen virallinen lista)	9
Switzerland (Schweizer Hitparade)	9
UK Singles (OCC)	67
West Germany (Official German Charts)	26

== Personnel ==
- Ricky Wilde : Keyboards, bass, Linn programmes, synclavier, backing vocals
- Mark Hayward Chaplin : Bass guitar, backing vocals
- Trevor Murrell : Drums
- Gary Barnacle : Saxophone
- Pete Schwier, Will Gosling, Simon Schofield, Keith Fernley : Engineers

== Covers ==
The song was also recorded in 1983 by Dutch-based singer Tony Sherman (nl) and released as a single. In 1985, it was recorded by Stacey Q on her debut album.
