= Time (Kim Wilde song) =

Single by Kim Wilde

from the album Love Moves
- B-side: "Someday"
- Released: 4 June 1990
- Recorded: 1989
- Genre: Pop · Hi-NRG
- Length: 4:12 (Album Version); 4:08 (7" Version); 6:00 (Extended Version)
- Label: MCA
- Songwriter(s): Kim Wilde, Ricki Wilde
- Producer(s): Ricki Wilde

Kim Wilde singles chronology
"It's Here" (1990)	"Time" (1990)	"Can't Get Enough (Of Your Love)" (1990)

"Time" is the second single from Love Moves, the 1990 album by Kim Wilde.

The song was slightly remixed from the version on the album for its release as a single and was extended for the 12" and CD-single formats. It was released exclusively in the United Kingdom where it stalled at the bottom end of the chart, but managed to remain there (between 71 and 75) for three weeks.

== Chart performance ==
Chart (1990)	Peak position
UK Singles (OCC)	71
