= Teases & Dares =

Studio album by Kim Wilde
- Released: 5 November 1984
- Recorded: 1984
- Studios: Select Sound Studios (Knebworth, Hertfordshire)
- Genres: Hi-NRG; disco; synth-pop
- Length: 42:08
- Label: MCA
- Producers: Ricki Wilde; Marty Wilde; Kim Wilde

Kim Wilde chronology
Catch as Catch Can (1983)	Teases & Dares (1984)	Another Step (1986)

Singles from Teases & Dares
- 1. "The Second Time" Released: 1 October 1984; 2. "The Touch" Released: 26 November 1984; 3. "Rage to Love" Released: 15 April 1985

Teases & Dares is the fourth studio album by the English pop singer Kim Wilde, released on 5 November 1984 by MCA Records. The song "Is It Over" is featured in the film Fletch (1985). All three singles were also released as picture discs, her only releases to ever be made into them.

== Background ==
After leaving Rak Records, who had released her first three studio albums, Wilde signed a recording contract with MCA Records in 1984. Her brother, Ricky Wilde, continued to serve as her producer, though was now assisted by their father, Marty Wilde, who also continued to co-write material. For the first time, Kim Wilde received a co-producer credit and the album also marked the first time in which she earned a sole songwriting credit, for the tracks "Fit In" and "Shangri-La".

Three singles were taken from the album. "The Second Time" reached the UK Top 30 and the Top 10 in Germany, as well as becoming only her second single to reach the Billboard Hot 100 in the US, where it was retitled "Go for It" and peaked at No. 65. The second single from the album, "The Touch", was less successful but the third single, "Rage to Love" (remixed by Dave Edmunds), returned Wilde to the UK Top 20 for the first time in three years.

=== Image change ===
Prompted by her new record label, Wilde underwent a change of image for Teases & Dares and found herself being recast "in an entirely new light". She changed from a girl wearing secondhand clothes with self-dyed hair, to a Barbarella-inspired sci-fi heroine (by XL Design) for the cover of "The Second Time". Though this was initially only for the single, MCA Records decided to use the new image for the album cover also, which Wilde objected to. She later claimed that the album sleeve was one of the reasons for its weak sales, stating that it confused members of her audience who still regarded her as the "girl next door". For subsequent single releases from the album, Wilde switched back to an image she identified more with. For the "Rage to Love" promotion, she wore one of her father's Teddy Boy jackets, in keeping with the rockabilly retro theme of the song.

== Critical reception ==
Professional ratings
Review scores
Source	Rating
AllMusic	2/5 stars
Smash Hits	6.5/10

Billboard magazine praised Wilde for combining "techno-pop with a torch-styled edge" and described the sound as "somewhere between Sheena Easton and Debbie Harry". Rolling Stone described the "randy" lyrics for "The Second Time", written by Wilde's brother and father, as "somewhat perverse" and found her "too bland and docile a singer to generate much heat or to enliven Ricki's stale wall-of-synths production." However, the reviewer reserved praise for Kim's self-written efforts, writing that "Fit In" and "Shangri-La" "have the passive, yearning tone of a jailhouse diary" and expressed hope that the "vivacious, earnest singer might be smart enough to cut loose her puppet strings."

== Track listing ==
All tracks are written by Ricky Wilde and Marty Wilde, except where noted.

Side one

1. "The Touch" – 4:13
2. "Is It Over" – 3:56
3. "Suburbs of Moscow" – 3:24
4. "Fit In" (Kim Wilde) – 4:38
5. "Rage to Love" – 4:20

Side two

1. "The Second Time" – 3:54
2. "Bladerunner" – 4:29
3. "Janine" – 3:47
4. "Shangri-La" (Kim Wilde) – 4:49
5. "Thought It Was Goodbye" (Kim Wilde, Ricki Wilde, Marty Wilde) – 4:38

== Bonus tracks (2010 remastered CD edition) ==
1. "Lovers on a Beach" ("The Second Time" B-side)
2. "Shangri-La" (Alternative Version)
3. "Putty in Your Hands" ("Rage to Love" B-side)
4. "Turn It On" (from the Weird Science soundtrack)
5. "The Second Time" (7" Version)
6. "The Touch" (7" Version)
7. "Rage to Love" (7" Version)

== Bonus CD (2010 remastered CD edition) ==
1. "The Second Time" (12" Version)
2. "Lovers on a Beach" (12" Version)
3. "Go for It" (Extended Dance Version)
4. "The Touch" (12" Version)
5. "Shangri-La" (12" Version)
6. "Go for It" (Dub Version)
7. "Rage to Love" (12" Version)
8. "Shangri-La" (Special Re-Mix)
9. "The Second Time" (US Remix)

== Personnel ==
All info taken from original LP.

- Kim Wilde – lead and backing vocals, Yamaha DX7 (4, 9), ARP String Synthesizer (4), Minimoog (9), ARP Quadra (1, 2, 6, 10), Memorymoog (2, 3, 10), Prophet-10 (1, 2, 10), PPG Wave (3, 6), Elka Synthex (1, 5, 7), Oberheim Eight Voice (9, 10), Oberheim OB-Xa (1, 2, 3, 5, 6)
- Ricky Wilde – Synclavier II (1, 2, 3, 5–10), Roland Jupiter-8 (1, 2, 3, 5–10), Minimoog (1, 5, 6, 7), ARP String Synthesizer (1, 2, 5, 7, 9), guitars (1, 3, 8), backing vocals (2, 3, 5–8), Yamaha DX7 (3, 6, 7, 10), bass (8, 9), ARP 2500 (1,2), harmonica, Synthnorma (1, 2, 5, 10), computer programming
- Steve Byrd – guitars (1, 4, 5, 8), backing vocals (1, 5, 8)
- Gary Twigg – bass (2, 3, 4, 10)
- Chris North – drums (1–5, 7, 8)
- Andy Duncan – percussion (10)

== Production ==
- Ricky Wilde – producer and arrangements (1, 2, 3, 5–8, 10)
- Marty Wilde – producer and arrangements (1, 2, 3, 5–8, 10)
- Kim Wilde – producer and arrangements (4, 9)
- Nigel Mills – engineer
- John Shaw – photography
- XL Design – album design

== Charts ==
Chart (1984–1985)	Peak position
European Albums (Music & Media)	28
Finnish Albums (Suomen virallinen lista)	24
German Albums (Offizielle Top 100)	22
Swedish Albums (Sverigetopplistan)	35
Swiss Albums (Schweizer Hitparade)	10
UK Albums (Official Charts)	66
US Billboard 200	84

Weekly chart performance for Teases & Dares: Expanded Edition
Chart (2026)	Peak position
Scottish Albums (Official Charts)	66
UK Independent Albums (Official Charts)	24
UK Album Sales Chart(OCC)	67

== Certifications ==
Region	Certification	Certified units/sales
Switzerland (IFPI Switzerland)	Gold	25,000^{^}
^{^} Shipments figures based on certification alone.
