= Supernaut (Australian band) =

Australian rock band from the 1970s

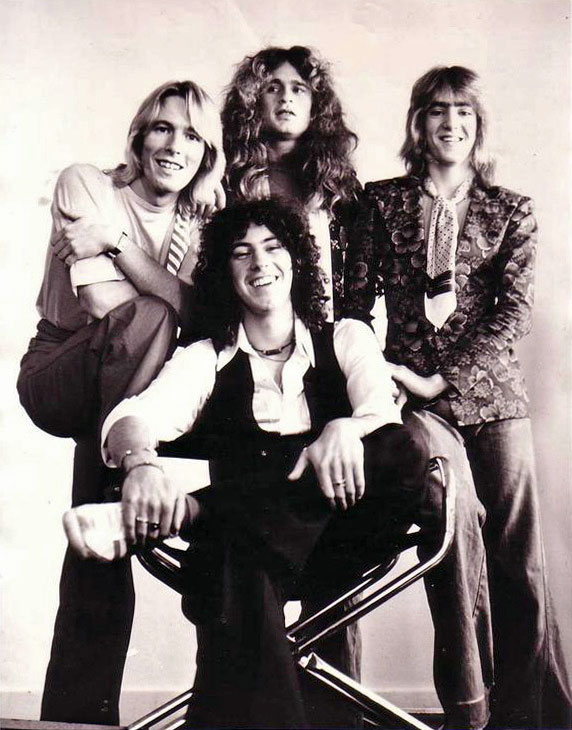
- Supernaury in 1976, left to right: Chris Burnham, Phillip Foxman and Joe Burnham; Gary Twinn (sitting)

Background information
- Also known as: Moby Dick; The Nauts
- Origin: Perth, Western Australia, Australia
- Genres: Glam rock; glam punk; punk rock; new wave
- Years active: 1974–1980; 2007; 2016
- Labels: Polydor; Wizard; Shock
- Past members: Chris Burnham; Joe Burnham; Randall Murphy; Gary Twinn; Little Russ Silver; Philip Foxman; Noel Kennedy

Supernaut were an Australian glam rock band from Perth. Formed as a pub-rock group, Moby Dick, by British-born brothers Chris Burnham on guitar and Joe Burnham on drums, they were joined late in 1974 by fellow immigrant Gary Twinn on lead vocals. After Randall Murphy joined on bass guitar, they changed their name. The group's debut single, "I Like It Both Ways" (May 1976), was produced by Molly Meldrum and was heavily promoted on his TV pop music show, Countdown. It peaked at No. 16 on the Kent Music Report singles chart. Their self-titled debut album reached No. 13 on the related Kent Music Report albums chart in November of that year. Murphy had left in June 1976 and was permanently replaced on bass guitar by Philip Foxman in August. The album provided another single, "Too Hot to Touch" (September 1976), which appeared at No. 14. In April 1979, the group shortened their name to The Nauts, returned to a heavier pub-rock sound and released a second album of that name in December 1979. They disbanded by March of the following year, with reformations occurring in 2007 and 2016.

== History ==
Supernaut were formed as Moby Dick, a pub-rock group, by British-born brothers Chris Burnham on guitar and Joe Burnham on drums. Fellow British immigrant, Gary Twinn, joined on lead vocals (ex-Sidewinders) in late 1974. Soon after Randall Murphy took up bass guitar and they changed their name to Supernaut. The name references, "Supernaut" (September 1972), a track by British heavy metal group, Black Sabbath. Australian musicologist, Ian McFarlane, observed, "despite the heavyweight name, the band... developed a commercially-minded glam rock style that relied as much on visual impact as the sound of the music."

The group relocated to Melbourne and were signed to Polydor Records in 1976 upon recommendation from Molly Meldrum, (in turn tipped off by Paul McCartney). In May 1976 they released their debut single, "I Like It Both Ways", which was produced by Meldrum. The song was initially shunned by some commercial radio stations in Sydney because of its controversial lyrics, but promotion on Meldrum's TV pop music show, Countdown, encouraged radio stations to play the track. "I Like It Both Ways" peaked at No. 16 on the Kent Music Report singles chart.

Randall Murphy left the group in June 1976, "citing mutual disagreement". He was temporarily replaced by Little Russ Silver (a.k.a. Argentino Russo), and more permanently by Philip Foxman (ex-Zygotes, Prothalis) in late August. Murphy returned to Perth. A follow-up single, "Too Hot to Touch", was released in September 1976, reaching No. 14 on the charts. Their self-titled debut album was released in mid-November 1976 and peaked at No. 13, achieving double gold certification. The group were presented with the TV Week King of Pop Award for Best Australian TV Performer (on Countdown) and for Most Popular New Group of 1976.

By November they had supported gigs by "Lou Reed, Suzie Quatro and Sweet and wherever they play there is raging hysteria." Julie Meldrum of The Canberra Times described their performance in Narrabundah: "Trouble began when Perth rock group Supernaut, which thrives on 'bopper' appeal, came on stage. The crowd made a rush for the group and many had to be forcibly removed. After the group finished its set organisers had to appeal for the crowd to move back from the stage 'or else someone will get hurt'."

In 1977, the band released two original singles, "Young and Innocent" (April) and "The Kids Are out Tonight" (July), and a cover version of "Let's Spend the Night Together" (November), originally by The Rolling Stones. They worked extensively on recording sessions for a proposed second album, with working titles included Exile and Test Pressing. "The Kids Are out Tonight" came from those sessions. After more than a year, they realised their music style was out of touch and the project was abandoned. In April 1978, they released another single, "Unemployed". before leaving Polydor.

The group relocated to Sydney and were signed to Robie Porter's Wizard Records in mid-1978. They returned to their original pub rock influences and "adopted a quasi-punk/new-wave direction". With the addition of Noel Kennedy on keyboards, they released, "Spies" (December 1978) McFarlane noted that their "live repertoire included cover versions of material by David Bowie, the Stranglers, XTC, and the Doors". They shortened their name to the Nauts in April 1979 and released, "Black Market World", following that with a new album under that name in December 1979, produced by Porter. The group had disbanded by March 1980.

== Post-breakup ==
Two years later, Gary Twinn was back in the United Kingdom, where he formed Twenty Flight Rockers with former Generation X drummer Mark Laff, and he later played with rock supergroup the International Swingers. Chris Burnham played in The Saints with Chris Bailey from 1982 and 1989. Philip Foxman formed Illustrated Man in 1984 with Japan member Rob Dean, Gary Numan keyboardist Roger Mason, and Hugo Burnham from Gang of Four. They recorded one self-titled album and toured the UK and US with their single, "Head Over Heels", charting the top 20 on MTV's dance charts. Foxman later had a solo career releasing two albums, West 4th and Charles and Up Antenna, as well as being a musical composer for Off Broadway show, Atomic, which ran for a limited season at the Acorn Theater, New York City.

Supernaut reformed for the Countdown Spectacular 2 Tour of Australia from late-August to early-September 2007. In 2016 Supernaut commemorated the 40th anniversary of "I Like It Both Ways" with a three-day tour from 16 to 18 June, followed by another show on 25 June at Charles Hotel in Perth.

== Members ==
- Chris Burnham – guitar (1974–80, 2007, 2016)
- Joe Burnham – drums (1974–80, 2007, 2016)
- Gary Twinn – vocals (1974–80, 2007, 2016)
- Randall Murphy – bass guitar (1974–76)
- Little Russ Silver (a.k.a. Argentino Russo) – bass guitar (1976)
- Philip Foxman – bass guitar, keyboards (1976–80, 2007, 2016)
- Noel Kennedy – keyboards (1978–80, 2016)

== Discography ==
=== Albums ===
List of albums, with selected chart positions
Title	Album details	Peak chart positions
Title	Album details	AUS
Supernaut	Released: November 1976; First studio album; Label: Polydor Records; Format: Vinyl, cassette	13
The Nauts	Released: December 1979; Second studio album; Label: Wizard Records; Format: Vinyl, cassette	-
I Like it Both Ways	Released: 1995; First greatest hits album; Label: Aureate Records; Format: Compact Disc	—
The Best of Supernaut	Released: 28 January 2016; Second greatest hits album; Label: Aureate Records; Format: Digital download	—

=== Singles ===
Year	Title	AUS
1976	"I Like It Both Ways"	16
1976	"Too Hot to Touch"	14
1977	"Let's Spend the Night Together"	—
1977	"Young and Innocent"	40
1977	"The Kids Are out Tonight"	44
1978	"Unemployed"	80
1978	"Spies"	—
1979	"Black Market World" (by the Nauts)	—

== Awards ==
=== King of Pop Awards ===
The King of Pop Awards were voted by the readers of TV Week. The King of Pop award started in 1967 and ran through to 1978.

Year	Nominee / work	Award	Result
1976	themselves	Best Australian TV Performer	Won
1976	themselves	Most Popular New Group	Won

== See also ==
- List of musical acts from Western Australia
