= This I Swear (Kim Wilde song) =

Single by Kim Wilde

from the album Now & Forever
- B-side: "Heaven"
- Released: 29 January 1996
- Genre: Pop; R&B
- Length: 4:23 (album version); 3:54 (radio mix)
- Label: MCA
- Songwriters: Tony Swain; Pam Sheyne
- Producers: Ricki Wilde; Serious Rope

Kim Wilde singles chronology
| "Breakin' Away" (1994) | "This I Swear" (1996) | "Shame" (1996) |

Music video
- "This I Swear" on YouTube

"This I Swear" is a song by the English pop singer Kim Wilde, released in January 1996, by MCA Records, as the second single from her ninth studio album, Now & Forever (1995). The song is written by Tony Swain and Pam Sheyne and produced by Ricki Wilde and Serious Rope. It peaked at number 46 on the UK Singles Chart and was issued in a slightly different form to that which is found on the album. 12" and CD single formats also include a 'Wilde Remix'. Another track from the same album, "Heaven" was used as the B-side and underwent several remixes. The UK 12" single also contained a remix of the previous single, "Breakin' Away".

== Critical reception ==
British magazine Music Week gave the song a score of three out of five, describing it as "a light, fluid ballad". James Hamilton from the Record Mirror Dance Update deemed it a "sincerely cooed mushy beat-ballad".

== Versions ==
"This I Swear"

"This I Swear" (radio mix)
"This I Swear" (Wilde remix)

"Heaven"

"Heaven" (Original 12")
"Heaven" (Matt Darey 12")
"Heaven" (Matt Darey dub)
"Heaven" (Matt Darey 7")
"Heaven" (Eddy Fingers Vocal)
"Heaven" (Eddy Fingers dub)

== Charts ==
| Chart (1995–1996) | Peak positions |
|---|---|
| Australia (ARIA) | 140 |
| Germany (GfK) | 91 |
| Scotland (OCC) | 54 |
| UK Singles (OCC) | 46 |
| UK Club Chart (Music Week) with "Heaven" | 25 |
