= Cambodia (song) =

1981 single by Kim Wilde

Single by Kim Wilde

from the album Select
- B-side: "Watching for Shapes"
- Released: 2 November 1981
- Genre: Synth-pop, new wave
- Length: 3:56 (7-inch version); 7:13 (album version, including "Reprise")
- Label: RAK
- Songwriters: Ricky Wilde, Marty Wilde
- Producer: Ricky Wilde

Kim Wilde singles chronology
"Water on Glass" (1981)	"Cambodia" (1981)	"View from a Bridge" (1982)

"Cambodia" is a song by British singer Kim Wilde. It was released as the fourth single of her second album, at the end of 1981—a year in which Wilde had already produced three highly successful hit singles and a best-selling debut album. The single was another international success, topping the charts of France, Sweden and Switzerland and reaching the top 10 in several other nations. The song was not released in North America.

"Cambodia" was released on the 7-inch format but also as a 12-inch single in West Germany, although not in a remixed or extended version. The B-side of both releases is an exclusive non-album track called "Watching for Shapes". "Cambodia" was later included on Wilde's second album, Select, which was released six months later.

== Composition ==
"Cambodia"
A 21-second sample of "Cambodia".

"Cambodia" was written by Marty Wilde and Ricki Wilde and has a length of seven minutes and thirteen seconds; on the album, it is teamed with a more uptempo instrumental version of the song called "Reprise". It borrows rifts from Boney M.’s “Ma Baker”. Musically and lyrically, "Cambodia" showed a change in direction for Kim Wilde from the new wave feel of her debut album. The song was mainly synth-driven, with east Asian-sounding percussion. According to Wilde:

It's a tragic love song. It's about someone who loses her lover in sad circumstances. It wasn't written as a commentary on the Cambodian situation, more like a 'song mystery'

— Kim Wilde

The Independent's Chris Mugan found the song reminiscent of a film noir. Stewart Mason of AllMusic noted that the song lacks the bubblegum pop influence present on Wilde's self-titled debut album, and is instead more synthesizer-driven. Matt James of PopMatters felt that the song was an attempt by Kim Wilde to prove that she could tackle serious issues, leading the way for The Human League's "The Lebanon" in 1984 and Sting's "Russians" in 1985.

== Critical reception ==
According to Yahoo!, songs like "Cambodia", "View from a Bridge" (1982) and Wilde's version of "You Keep Me Hangin' On" (1986) brought her "very close to [the] hearts" of Australians. The Independent's Chris Mugan deemed the song one of Wilde's "eighties classics" alongside "Kids in America". In the Encyclopedia of Popular Music, Colin Larkin opined that Wilde tried "a more adventurous sound" with "Cambodia," indicating that she was "an exciting talent." The Ipswich Star's Wayne Savage said that "Cambodia" and "Chequered Love" (1981) are "seminal smashes" which prove that Wilde "struck gold more often than not." Vogue's Rachel Hahn called the song an "underrated classic".

Stewart Mason of AllMusic noted that "Kim Wilde's second album didn't score any hits on the level of the debut's 'Kids in America,' although the dramatic 'Cambodia' was a sort of cult favorite in some circles." Writing for the same website, John Bush called the track a "fan favorite" and an "odd, chilling attempt to record a dirge for Southeastern Asia." In The Legacies of Jean-Luc Godard, Douglas Morrey wrote that "'Cambodia' is not...a particularly moving record". In his review of The Singles Collection 1981–1993 in All Music Guide to Rock: The Definitive Guide to Rock, Pop, and Soul, Mike DeGagne wrote that "Only the unbecoming 'Cambodia' and the hollowed out 'Child Come Away' should be avoided on this collection, as both lack the spirit that Wilde usually packs."

== Use in media ==
The song was featured in the 2021 series Yellowjackets in the episode 'The Dollhouse'. and the 2018 horror film The Strangers: Prey at Night.

== Track listing ==
UK / Europe / Australia 7" and Germany 12" single (1981)

1. "Cambodia" – 3:56
2. "Watching for Shapes" – 3:42

NB The B-side of the Australian single is given the title "Don't Count Me Out" but is in fact identical to "Watching for Shapes".

== Charts ==
=== Weekly charts ===
Chart (1981–1982)	Peak position
Australia (Kent Music Report)	7
Austria (Ö3 Austria Top 40)	4
Belgium (Ultratop 50 Flanders)	2
Finland (Suomen virallinen lista)	10
France (SNEP)	1
Ireland (IRMA)	15
Luxembourg (Radio Luxembourg)	19
Netherlands (Dutch Top 40)	2
Netherlands (Single Top 100)	5
New Zealand (Recorded Music NZ)	21
Norway (VG-lista)	3
South Africa (Springbok Radio)	2
Sweden (Sverigetopplistan)	1
Switzerland (Schweizer Hitparade)	1
UK Singles (Official Charts)	12
West Germany (GfK)	2

=== Year-end charts ===
Chart (1982)	Position
Australia (Kent Music Report)	26
Austria (Ö3 Austria Top 40)	15
Belgium (Ultratop)	4
France (SNEP)	7
Netherlands (Dutch Top 40)	5
Netherlands (Single Top 100)	32
South Africa (Springbok Radio)	19
Switzerland (Schweizer Hitparade)	15
West Germany (Official German Charts)	15

== Certifications ==
Region	Certification	Certified units/sales
France (SNEP)	Gold	1,000,000
