= Kim Wilde (album) =

Studio album by Kim Wilde
- Released: 29 June 1981
- Recorded: 1980–1981
- Studios: The Lodge and RAK Studios (London, UK)
- Genres: Pop; synth-pop; new wave; post-punk
- Length: 37:09
- Label: Rak
- Producer: Ricky Wilde

Kim Wilde chronology
Kim Wilde (1981)	Select (1982)

Singles from Kim Wilde
- 1. "Kids in America" Released: February 1981; 2. "Chequered Love" Released: May 1981; 3. "Water on Glass" Released: July 1981

Kim Wilde is the debut studio album by the English singer Kim Wilde, released on 29 June 1981 by Rak Records. Fronted by the top 10 singles "Kids in America" and "Chequered Love" and greeted with a generally positive response from critics, the album launched Wilde into stardom and remains one of her most popular recordings.

== Background and recording ==
The songs on the album were all written by Kim's father, the successful 1950s rock and roll singer Marty Wilde, and her younger brother Ricky Wilde. Ricky drew inspiration from the contemporary synth-pop acts Orchestral Manoeuvres in the Dark (OMD), Gary Numan, Ultravox and John Foxx, as well as the punk rock bands Skids and the Stranglers. OMD and Numan were particularly influential on the lead single, "Kids in America". The symphonic rock group the Enid served as the backing band. According to Enid leader Robert John Godfrey, the Enid got along well with Wilde but were paid "a pittance" because the album was recorded in their studio.

Production duties were fulfilled by Ricky Wilde. The cover portraits were taken by renowned British photographer Gered Mankowitz.

Musically, the album is mainly new wave and rock-oriented, but it also features a reggae track ("Everything We Know"), and a brass section appears on "2-6-5-8-0".

Lyrically, Marty Wilde included love songs and also a song ("Water on Glass") about tinnitus (a medical condition that causes ringing in the ears), a song about the deterioration of inner cities ("Our Town") and a song about a theory that sound is alive ("Tuning in Tuning On").

== Critical response ==
Professional ratings
Review scores
Source	Rating
AllMusic	4.5/5 stars
Record Collector	4/5 stars
Record Mirror	4/5 stars
Smash Hits	6½/10
Sounds	3.5/5 stars

Kim Wilde received generally positive reviews from contemporary critics. Commending the mix of up-tempo and slower tracks as well as Wilde's versatility, Australian publication The Chronicle found "Water on Glass" to be "reminiscent of some of the early 60s rock" and highlighted "Our Town" as "one of the best tracks", comparing the subject matter to Simon & Garfunkel's "My Little Town". Donald Robertson of Roadrunner called the three singles "masterpieces" and concluded that the "pure pop" album was "fun to listen to when you're having fun". Eric Chappe called the album an "immediately striking disc", citing the "'60s girl group mannerisms" and "Spector-esque drum sound" of "Water on Glass" while drawing comparisons to both Dusty Springfield and Debbie Harry.

Writing for The Globe and Mail, Alan Niester again compared Wilde to Dusty Springfield and Debbie Harry, but called "2-6-5-8-0" and "You'll Never Be So Wrong" "extremely promising", describing the latter as "a moody and captivating ballad that stands head and shoulders above all the Blondie and Pat Benatar simulations." David Hepworth of Smash Hits sarcastically suggested "this is the best Blondie album for a couple of years" but expressed hope that the singer would assert herself more in the future. High Fidelity's Mitchell Cohen found Wilde's voice alternately "plaintive" and "shrill" but described the album as "entertaining" and "a lot of fun", again drawing comparisons to the music of the 1960s. Record Mirror critic Mike Nicholls praised Wilde's voice and individuality despite comparing the reggae-influenced "Everything We Know" to "The Tide Is High" by Blondie, released the previous year. Calling "Tuning in Tuning On" a "clever closer", Nicholls suggested that the track provided "requisite experimentation" and could indicate a new synth-driven direction for the singer; a prescient prediction with regards to the sound of her subsequent albums.

== Chart performance ==
Kim Wilde entered the UK Albums Chart at No. 10, moving into the top 3 the next week; the album was certified gold by the BPI for sales exceeding 100,000 copies. During promotion, Kim's band consisted of Ricky Wilde, James Stevenson and later boyfriend Calvin Hayes, who also appeared on the sleeve of the album. Kim later commented that, at that time in the industry, it was passé for a female to attempt to launch a serious career in pop music on her own, and that the backing band had been shown on the sleeve to give credibility to the album. Still, she was accused of trying to copy the allure of US band Blondie. The album was released in North America on 6 April 1982, reaching No. 86 in the US and No. 42 in Canada.

== Track listing ==
All songs written by Ricky Wilde and Marty Wilde, except where noted.

Side one

1. "Water on Glass" – 3:31
2. "Our Town" – 3:49
3. "Everything We Know" – 3:46
4. "Young Heroes" – 3:13
5. "Kids in America" – 3:27

Side two

6. "Chequered Love" – 3:21
7. "2-6-5-8-0" – 3:12
8. "You'll Never Be So Wrong" – 4:18
9. "Falling Out" (R. Wilde) – 4:05
10. "Tuning in Tuning On" – 4:27

Bonus tracks (2009 remastered CD edition)

11. "Shane" ("Chequered Love" B-side) – 4:11
12. "Boys" ("Water on Glass" B-side) – 3:31
13. "Water on Glass" (7" Version) – 3:32

== Personnel ==
- Kim Wilde – lead and backing vocals

=== The Enid ===
- Robert John Godfrey – keyboards
- Stephen Stewart – guitars
- Francis Lickerish – guitars
- Martin Russell – bass
- Chris North – drums

=== Additional musicians ===
- Ricky Wilde – keyboards, guitars, backing vocals
- Miffy Smith – keyboards
- James Stevenson – guitars
- Alan Cowley – bass
- Trevor Murrell – drums
- Jake Sollo – percussion
- Gary Barnacle – saxophone (7)
- Luke Tunney – trumpet (7)

== Production ==
- Ricky Wilde – producer
- Stephen Stewart – engineer
- Joe Lemay – mastering at Capitol Mastering (Hollywood, California, USA).
- John Pasche – cover design
- Gered Mankowitz – cover photography

== Charts ==
=== Weekly charts ===
Chart (1981–1982)	Peak position
Australian Albums (Kent Music Report)	25
Canada Top Albums/CDs (RPM)	42
Dutch Albums (Album Top 100)	5
Finnish Albums (Suomen virallinen lista)	3
German Albums (Offizielle Top 100)	1
New Zealand Albums (RMNZ)	39
Swedish Albums (Sverigetopplistan)	1
UK Albums (Official Charts)	3
US Billboard 200	86

Weekly chart performance for Kim Wilde
Chart (2020)	Peak position
Scottish Albums (Official Charts)	50
UK Independent Albums (Official Charts)	13
UK Album Sales Chart(OCC)	52

=== Year-end charts ===
Chart (1981)	Position
Dutch Albums (Album Top 100)	70
German Albums (Offizielle Top 100)	30

== Certifications and sales ==
Region	Certification	Certified units/sales
Finland (Musiikkituottajat)	Gold	42,006
Germany (BVMI)	Gold	250,000^{^}
United Kingdom (BPI)	Gold	100,000^{^}
Summaries
Europe as of September 1981	—	500,000
^{^} Shipments figures based on certification alone.
