= Can't Get Enough (Of Your Love) =

Single by Kim Wilde

from the album Love Moves
- B-side: "Someday" / "Virtual World" (France)
- Released: June 1990 (France), August 1990 (Germany), 13 August 1990 (Australia)
- Genre: Pop; synth-rock
- Length: 4:00 (Album Version); 3:48 (7" Version)
- Label: MCA
- Songwriters: Kim Wilde, Ricki Wilde
- Producer: Ricki Wilde

Kim Wilde singles chronology
"Time" (1990)	"Can't Get Enough (Of Your Love)" (1990)	"I Can't Say Goodbye" (1990)

Music video
- "Can't Get Enough (Of Your Love)" on YouTube

"Can't Get Enough (Of Your Love)" is a song by English singer Kim Wilde, released as the third single from her seventh album, Love Moves (1990). It was also the first single from this album to be released in France (in its full-length album form), and the second in continental Europe and Australia (where it was edited). It was not released in the UK. The track was extended for the 12" and CD-single formats. The Single sold 50,000 units in France. In Israel, it peaked at number two on the Israeli Top-30.

== Charts ==
=== Weekly charts ===
Chart (1990–1993)	Peak position
Europe (Eurochart Hot 100)	69
Finland (Suomen virallinen lista)	19
France (SNEP)	21
Germany (Media Control Charts)	58
Israel (Israeli Singles Chart)	2

=== Year-end charts ===
Chart (1993)	Position
Israel (Israeli Singles Chart)	35
