= Gary Twinn =

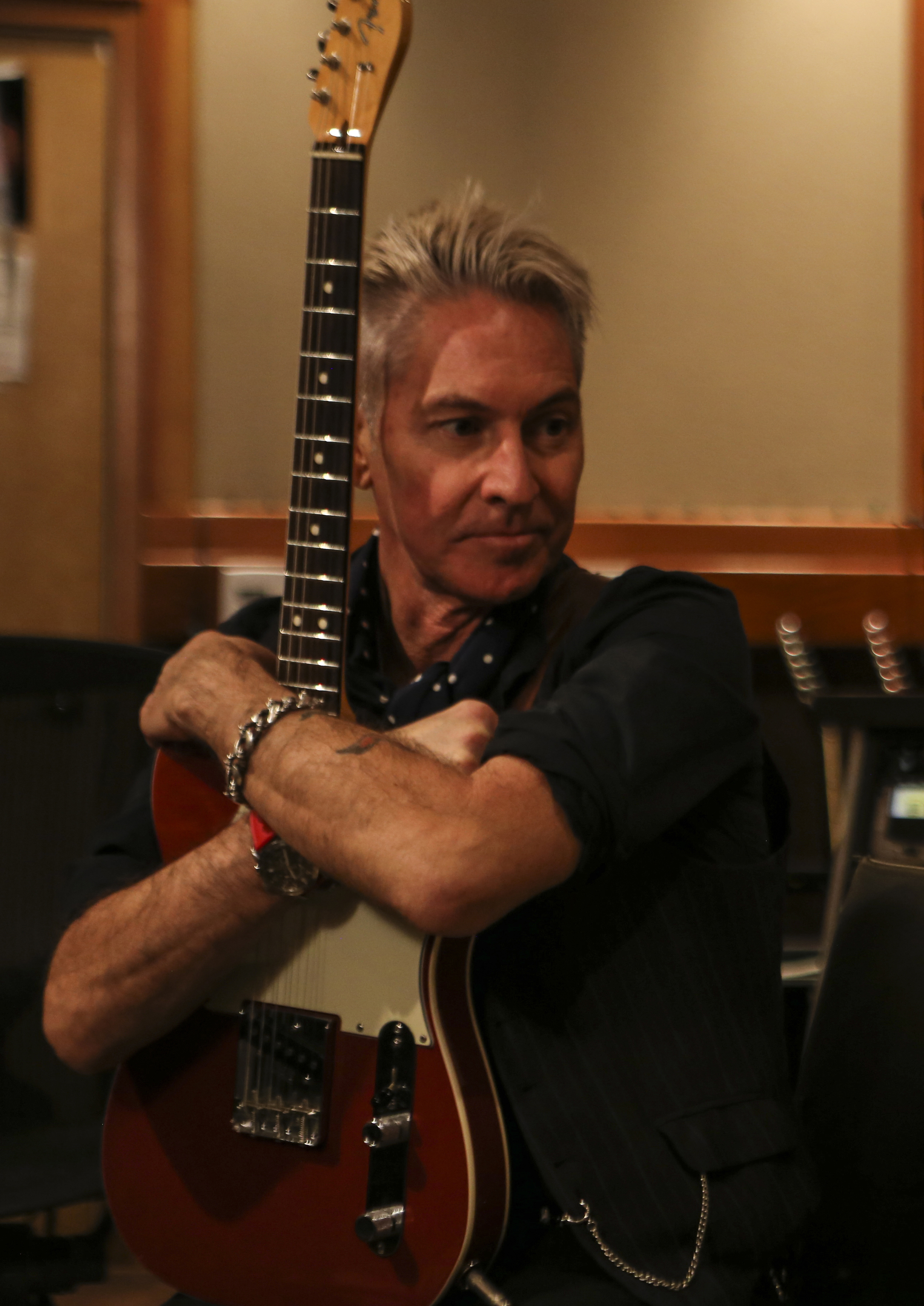
- Gary Twinn (2015)

Background information
- Born: 7 December 1956 (age 69); West Ham, London, England
- Genres: Glam rock, punk rock, rock 'n' roll, rockabilly, new wave, alternative country
- Occupation: Musician
- Instruments: Vocals, guitar, harmonica
- Years active: 1974–present

Gary Twinn (born 7 December 1956) is an English singer-songwriter, musician, TV host and editorial writer, currently fronting punk rock supergroup The International Swingers, which also features Clem Burke, Glen Matlock and James Stevenson.

== Supernaut ==
Twinn's family emigrated to Australia in 1969, where (while attending Rossmoyne Senior High School, Perth) he formed the glam/punk band Supernaut, with fellow Brit-immigrant students Chris and Joe Burnham. Influenced by T. Rex, David Bowie, The New York Dolls and Iggy Pop, they quickly gained popularity and notoriety for their wild stage antics, clothes and controversial lyrics. When asked his impressions of Australia during a Wings tour Paul McCartney mentioned Supernaut and the media immediately took note. The group's first single "I Like It Both Ways" was banned by radio and soared to the no. 1 chart position, thanks to TV performances on Countdown and Bandstand, forcing radio to reverse its position. Other hits followed, a gold album and a second, critically acclaimed but commercially poor, LP that more closely resembled the band's original style.

== Twenty Flight Rockers ==
In 1980, Twinn had already decided to relocate back to London, where he formed Twenty Flight Rockers with ex-Generation X drummer Mark Laff, joined by guitarist Ian McKean and Jeff Vine on bass. Drawing influences from Eddie Cochran, Elvis Presley, Gene Vincent and Johnny Kidd, the new band adopted a black biker leather clad look and a focus on pure roll 'n' roll blended with a punk rock attitude. The group toured clubs in London, and were subsequently invited to play the BBC's Janice Long show. In 1985, Twenty Flight Rockers released the single "Tower Block Rock" (ranked No. 31 for Best Single on Rockerilla Magazine) with ABC Records, and in 1986 the single "Johnny 7" with WEA Records. Subsequently, Bernie Rhodes (the former manager of The Clash) was hired to manage them. He decided for the band to sign with Epic Records, and he had McKean replaced by The Rockats guitarist Danny B. Harvey. Twenty Flight Rockers recorded a series of sessions (compiled by Twinn and Harvey) as well as an entire studio album entitled Ride. "Black Leather Jacket" was released as a single promo, with the album due to follow in mid 1988. However, Epic was bought out by Sony, who then dropped the band from the label. Disappointed by political mismanagement from record companies, Twenty Flight Rockers broke up.

After the demise of Twenty Flight Rockers, Bernard Rhodes suggested that Gary record with ex-Sex Pistols bassist Glen Matlock and guitarist Steve New under the moniker Rhode-Twinn. In 1990, a single, "Bike Boy", was released on Rhodes' own Sacred record label.

Twinn and Matlock stayed in touch and began writing and recording with The Damned drummer Rat Scabies and Generation X guitarist Bob "Derwood" Andrews in 1996. Andrews named the band Dead Horse and a US tour was arranged. However, almost immediately Glen rejoined the Sex Pistols, and the group was disbanded.

On July 24, 2026, Twenty Flight Rockers announced their return for a London show at the 100 Club on October 30, with tickets going on sale on July 27. They also revealed an archive live release of Live '85, a concert originally recorded at The Bull in East Sheen from July 1985.

== The Honeydippers ==
Twinn reunited with guitarist Danny B. Harvey, forming a rockabilly duo named The Honeydippers (with Clem Burke joining on drums and John Carlucci on stand up bass). The duo recorded some sessions (Honeydipper Stomp) as well as standard studio album called Big E Boogie. The LPs were then followed by the 1997 Christmas album 12 Days of Christmas. Their song, "Rock, Santa, Rock", was featured in the 2001 film I Saw Mommy Kissing Santa Claus.

== Speedtwinn ==
In 1998, Twinn teamed with Derwood and formed an alternative country band, Speedtwinn, along with Mario Barmosca and Dale S. Daniel. With a range of influences from T. Rex to Johnny Cash, Speedtwinn played a blend of American roots and British rock and roll. Gary Twinn and Bob "Derwood" Andrews wrote and recorded the self-produced album California.

== The International Swingers ==
The band Supernaut reformed in 2007 for a successful Australian Countdown tour. When approached in 2011 to repeat this, Twinn instead opted to invite his close pals Clem Burke, James Stevenson and Glen Matlock to form a band with the sole intention of playing Australian dates. Naming themselves The International Swingers the group played a Los Angeles warm up show in November 2011 and flew directly to Australia for shows in Melbourne, Geelong, Sydney and Adelaide. During rehearsals and the Australian tour they got along well and The International Swingers continued. In 2012 – 2014 the band performed tours in California and in 2013 a sold out show in London. Initially they played a set of the greatest hits of all the bands they've been in, but soon they began writing new songs for The International Swingers, like "FBI" (included in the soundtrack of the film Homefront),

Via PledgeMusic, the band raised the money to record their first full-length self-titled album, The International Swingers (originally under the working title Whatever Works Now). The album was recorded at Studio 606 in LA which is owned by the Foo Fighters. It was then mixed by Peter Walsh who has worked with Simple Minds, Pulp and most recently Scott Walker.
