= Water on Glass =

Single by Kim Wilde

from the album Kim Wilde
- B-side: "Boys"
- Released: 17 July 1981
- Recorded: The Record Plant Sausalito CA winter 1981
- Genre: Pop; new wave
- Length: 3:29 (Album Version); 3:36 (7" Version)
- Label: RAK
- Songwriters: Ricky Wilde, Marty Wilde
- Producer: Ricky Wilde

Kim Wilde singles chronology
"Chequered Love" (1981)	"Water on Glass" (1981)	"Cambodia" (1981)

"Water on Glass" is the third single by British singer Kim Wilde from her self-titled album.

A slightly different version of the song was featured on Wilde's eponymous debut album. It was released in the UK, Ireland and The Netherlands only with the non-album track "Boys" on the B-side. The song was also the first track by Kim Wilde to appear on a Billboard chart, reaching #53 on the Top 60 Rock Tracks on 15 May 1982.

The song is about tinnitus, a medical condition that causes ringing in the ears.

== Critical reception ==
"Water on Glass" made a big impression on David Hepworth of Smash Hits: "What's the best track on the album? This one? O.K., whack it out single-shaped. Ricky's deck is as full of well practised tricks as ever; shimmering synths slip 'n' slide round a knuckle full of beat while Kim's perfectly detached vocal drags the chorus in like a trouper."

== Track listing ==
UK / Netherlands 7" single [1981]

1. "Water On Glass" [Single Version] - 3:36
2. "Boys" - 3:16

== Charts ==
Chart (1981–1982)	Peak position
Ireland (IRMA)	10
Luxembourg (Radio Luxembourg)	4
UK Singles (OCC)	11
US Mainstream Rock (Billboard)	53
