= View from a Bridge =

Single by Kim Wilde

from the album Select
- B-side: "Take Me Tonight"
- Released: 5 April 1982
- Recorded: 1981
- Genre: New wave
- Length: 3:32
- Label: RAK
- Songwriters: Ricky Wilde; Marty Wilde
- Producer: Ricky Wilde

Kim Wilde singles chronology
"Cambodia" (1981)	"View from a Bridge" (1982)	"Child Come Away" (1982)

"View from a Bridge" is a song by the English pop singer Kim Wilde, released internationally as the second single from her second album, Select (1982). The song tells the story of a girl committing suicide by jumping off a bridge after finding her lover with another girl. It was number 1 in Europarade Hitrank and a top 10 hit in several European countries and in Australia. A faster version with a dance beat was released in 2006 on Never Say Never.

== Charts ==
=== Weekly charts ===
Chart (1982)	Peak position
Australia (Kent Music Report)	7
Austria (Ö3 Austria Top 40)	10
Belgium (Ultratop 50 Flanders)	4
Finland (Suomen virallinen lista)	5
Ireland (IRMA)	16
Luxembourg (Radio Luxembourg)	6
Netherlands (Dutch Top 40)	5
Netherlands (Single Top 100)	7
Sweden (Sverigetopplistan)	4
Switzerland (Schweizer Hitparade)	2
UK Singles (Official Charts)	16
West Germany (GfK)	6

=== Year-end charts ===
Chart (1982)	Position
Australia (Kent Music Report)	33
Belgium (Ultratop Flanders)	37
Netherlands (Dutch Top 40)	55
Netherlands (Single Top 100)	71
Switzerland (Schweizer Hitparade)	14
West Germany (Official German Charts)	51

Certifications

France (SNEP) Gold +250.000
