= Chequered Love =

1981 single by Kim Wilde

Single by Kim Wilde

from the album Kim Wilde
- B-side: "Shane” (UK); "Everything We Know (North America)
- Released: 27 April 1981
- Genre: Rock; pop
- Length: 3:20
- Label: RAK (UK) EMI (US)
- Songwriters: Ricky Wilde, Marty Wilde
- Producer: Ricky Wilde

Kim Wilde singles chronology
"Kids in America" (1981)	"Chequered Love" (1981)	"Water on Glass" (1981)

"Chequered Love" is the second single by British singer Kim Wilde. The song was released in the spring of 1981 to follow Wilde's successful debut "Kids in America". As with that single, writing credits were given to Wilde's father and brother Marty and Ricky Wilde, with the latter also being given production credits. The 12" version is no longer in length than the 7"; however, better sound quality is achieved by the grooves not being as compressed, a common practice for "marketing" during the 1980s. The song later appeared on Wilde's self-titled debut album.

Lyrically, the song describes how opposites attract, and was inspired by Wilde's parents, who are very dissimilar people. "Chequered Love" became another hit for Wilde, reaching the number four on the UK Singles Chart, number one in South Africa (succeeding "Kids in America"), and peaking inside the top 10 all around the world except North America. It was certified gold in the UK and France, for sales of 250,000 copies and has sold over a million copies worldwide. The song was also followed by a music video directed by Brian Grant, which was set in a steamy, black-tiled bathroom.

== Track listing ==
UK / Europe / Australia 7" single [1981]

1. "Chequered Love" - 3:20
2. "Shane" - 3:29

Germany 12" single [1981]

1. "Chequered Love" - 3:20
2. "Shane" - 3:29

US / Canada 7" single [1982]

1. "Chequered Love" - 3:20
2. "Everything We Know" - 3:42

== Charts ==
=== Weekly charts ===
Chart (1981)	Peak position
Australia (Kent Music Report)	6
Austria (Ö3 Austria Top 40)	16
Belgium (Ultratop 50 Flanders)	2
Ireland (IRMA)	4
Luxembourg (Radio Luxembourg)	3
Netherlands (Dutch Top 40)	2
Netherlands (Single Top 100)	2
South Africa (Springbok Radio)	1
Sweden (Sverigetopplistan)	6
Switzerland (Schweizer Hitparade)	2
UK Singles (OCC)	4
West Germany (GfK)	2

=== Year-end charts ===
Chart (1981)	Position
Australia (Kent Music Report)	45
Belgium (Ultratop 50 Flanders)	10
Netherlands (Dutch Top 40)	37
Netherlands (Single Top 100)	46
South Africa (Springbok Radio)	14
Switzerland (Schweizer Hitparade)	17
West Germany (Official German Charts)	24
