= Child Come Away =

Single by Kim Wilde
- B-side: "Just Another Guy"
- Released: 4 October 1982
- Genre: Pop; new wave
- Length: 4:07
- Label: RAK
- Songwriters: Ricky Wilde; Marty Wilde
- Producer: Ricky Wilde

Kim Wilde singles chronology
"View from a Bridge" (1982)	"Child Come Away" (1982)	"Love Blonde" (1983)

"Child Come Away" is a song by English singer Kim Wilde, released as a single on 4 October 1982.

Though its subject matter was dark, it was similar in sound to previous synth-driven successes like "Cambodia" and "View from a Bridge", and it was also an exclusive single release, unavailable on an album. It features Gary Barnacle on saxophone.

The single peaked at number 43 on the UK Singles Chart, while reaching the top 10 in Sweden and Switzerland.

== Charts ==
Chart (1982)	Peak position
Australia (Kent Music Report)	76
Belgium (Ultratop 50 Flanders)	25
Netherlands (Single Top 100)	47
Netherlands (Tipparade)	15
Sweden (Sverigetopplistan)	10
Switzerland (Schweizer Hitparade)	6
UK Singles (Official Charts)	43
West Germany (GfK)	36
