= Phantasma =

Phantasma may refer to:

- Phantasm (disambiguation)

== Music ==
- Phantasma (Leon Bolier album), an album by Leon Bolier
- Phantasma (Cemetery album)
- PhantasmaChronica, an album by Korovakill under the name of Chryst
- Phantasma (band), a heavy metal project comprising Charlotte Wessels, Georg Neuhauser, and Oliver Philipps

== Games ==
- BlazBlue: Chrono Phantasma, 2-D fighting game
- Armored Core: Project Phantasma, 1997 video game for the Sony PlayStation
- BlazBlue: Clone Phantasma, 2012 3D arena fighting game

== Animals ==
- Elysius phantasma, a species of moth of the family Erebidae found in French Guiana and Surinam
- Eilema phantasma, a moth of the family Erebidae found in Madagascar
- Chimaera phantasma, a species of fish in the family Chimaeridae found near Australia, China, Japan, North Korea, South Korea
- Spalacopsis phantasma, a species of beetle in the family Cerambycidae
- Asura phantasma, a moth of the family Erebidae that is found in India
- Lemonia phantasma, a moth of the family Lemoniidae found from Spain up to Egypt and North Africa

== Entertainment ==
- Phantasma, kingdom in The Queen's Knight
- Phantasma, a new attraction in Coney Island in Love Never Dies (musical)
- Phantasma, a laughter prone musically talented ghost girl from the movie Scooby-Doo and the Ghoul School

== See also ==
- Phantasy (disambiguation)
