= Fantasy (disambiguation) =

Fantasy is a genre of fiction.

Fantasy, Fantasie, or Fantasies may also refer to:

== Arts and entertainment ==
=== Music ===
- Fantasia (music), a free-form musical composition
- Fantasie (Widmann), a 1993 composition for solo clarinet by Jörg Widmann
- Fantasie in C (Schumann), an 1836 composition for solo piano by Robert Schumann
- Fantasy (group), a 1980s American vocal group
- Fantasy Records, an American record label
  - Fantasy Studios, a defunct studio operated by Fantasy Records

==== Albums ====
- Fantasie (Münchener Freiheit album), a German-language album, 1988
- Fantasie (Nicola Benedetti album), 2009
- Fantasies (album), by Metric, 2009
- Fantasy (Candy Lo album), 2001
- Fantasy (Carole King album), 1973
- Fantasy (Jay Chou album), 2001
- Fantasy (Lena Philipsson album) or the title song, 1993
- Fantasy (Lightning Dust album), 2013
- Fantasy (M83 album), 2023
- Fantasy (Münchener Freiheit album), an English-language album, 1988
- Fantasy (Ramsey Lewis album), 1985
- Fantasy (Regine Velasquez album), 2010
- Fantasy (Gensoukyoku), by Akina Nakamori, 1983
- Fantasy, by Manau, 2013
- Fantasy, a single album by Fei, or the title song, 2016
- Fantasy (SF9 EP), 2024
- Fantasy, an EP by Chloe Kohanski, 2019
- Fantasy, an EP by No Rome, 2013
- Fantasy: Mariah Carey at Madison Square Garden, a video, 1996

==== Songs ====
- "Fantasy" (Aldo Nova song), 1982
- "Fantasy" (Alice Nine song), 2006
- "Fantasy" (Appleton song), 2002
- "Fantasy" (Bashy song), 2010
- "Fantasy" (Danny Fernandes song), 2008
- "Fantasy" (DyE song), 2011
- "Fantasy" (Earth, Wind & Fire song), 1978; covered by Black Box, 1990
- "Fantasy" (George Michael song), 1990
- "Fantasy" (Jade Thirlwall song), 2024
- "Fantasy" (Jolin Tsai song), 2012
- "Fantasy" (Mariah Carey song), 1995
- "Fantasy" (Nadia Ali song), 2010
- "Fantasy" (Natasha Hamilton song), 2026
- "Fantasy" (Tesla Boy song), 2012
- "Fantasy", by Bazzi from Cosmic, 2018
- "Fantasy", by the Blizzards from A Public Display of Affection, 2006
- "Fantasy", by Bone Thugs from New Waves, 2017
- "Fantasy", by Do or Die from Pimpin' Ain't Dead, 2003
- "Fantasy", by Exile, 2010
- "Fantasy," by M.A.R.S., from Project: Driver, 1986
- "Fantasy", by Pink Fantasy, 2019
- "Fantasy", by Gerard Kenny, 1980
- "Fantasy", by Meiko Nakahara, 1982
- "Fantasy", by MS MR from Secondhand Rapture, 2013
- "Fantasy", by Sekai no Owari, 2010
- "Fantasy", by Sofi Tukker, 2019
- "Fantasy", by Superfruit from Future Friends, 2017
- "Fantasy", by VIXX from Hades, 2016
- "Fantasy", by the xx from xx, 2009
- "The Fantasy", by 30 Seconds to Mars from A Beautiful Lie, 2005

=== Periodicals ===
- Fantasy magazine, any magazine which publishes primarily fantasy fiction
- Fantasy (1938 magazine), a 1938–1939 British pulp science fiction magazine
- Fantasy (1946 magazine), a 1946–1947 British science fiction magazine
- Fantasy Magazine (1953), an American fantasy magazine published in 1953 as one of John Raymond's science fiction magazines
- Fantasy Magazine (2005), American online fantasy and science fiction magazine published from 2005 to 2011 and 2020 to present

=== Publishers ===
- Fantasy Press, a defunct American fantasy and science fiction publishing house, founded in 1946 by Lloyd Arthur Eshbach
- Fantasy Press (poetry), an English publisher of poetry 1951–1959
- Fantasy Productions, a German book and role-playing game publishing company founded in 1983
- Fantasy Publishing Company, Inc., a defunct American science fiction and fantasy small press, founded in 1946 by William L. Crawford

=== Theater shows ===
- Fantasy (Las Vegas show), a topless revue performed at the Luxor Las Vegas

=== Other media ===
- Fantasies (film), a 1981 German-made English-language drama film
- Fantasy (film), a 2025 Slovenian-Macedonian drama film
- Fantasy (game show), a 1982–1983 American game show
- Fantasy (video game), a 1981 action/adventure arcade game
- "Fantasy", a poem by Patti Smith from her 1972 book Seventh Heaven

== People ==
- Fantasy (gamer), Jung Myung-Hoon (born 1991), South Korean professional StarCraft player
- Fantasy (Mini-Estrella) (born 1989), Mexican masked professional wrestler
- Sensei (wrestler) or Fantasy (born 1978), Mexican masked professional wrestler

== Other uses ==
- Fantasy (psychology), a range of mental experiences mediated by the faculty of imagination
  - Sexual fantasy, a fantasy that stirs a person's sexuality
- Fantasy, the drug GHB
- Fantasy-class cruise ship, a class of ships operated by Carnival Cruise Line
  - Carnival Fantasy, a Carnival Cruise Line ship 1988–2020
- Fantasy, a women's fragrance endorsed by Britney Spears

== See also ==
- Fantasia (disambiguation)
- Fantasio (disambiguation)
- Phantasm (disambiguation)
- Phantasy (disambiguation)
