= Fantasmagorie =

Fantasmagorie may refer to:

- Fantasmagorie, a 1908 French short film, an early piece of animation
- Fantasmagorie, a 2006 album by the Polish band Akurat

== See also ==
- Phantasmagoria, a form of illusion performance and horror theatre using magic lanterns
- Phantasmagoria (disambiguation)
- Phantasm (disambiguation)
- Fantasmagoria, an Argentinian rock band
