= Phantasy =

Phantasy, Phantasie, or Phantasies may refer to:

- Fantasy, archaically spelled phantasy, a genre of speculative fiction that involves supernatural or magical elements
- Fantasy (psychology), also spelt phantasy, a broad range of mental experiences, mediated by the faculty of imagination in the human brain
- Phantasy (record label), a British independent record label
- Phantasie (series), a role-playing video game series
  - Phantasie, a 1985 video game
  - Phantasie II, 1986 video game
  - Phantasie III, a 1987 video game
- Phantasies, an American animated short film series
- Phantasies (album), a 1984 album by Jaki Byard and the Apollo Stompers

== See also ==
- Fantasy (disambiguation)
- Phantasm (disambiguation)
- Phantasma (disambiguation)
