= Keeping the Dream Alive =

"Keeping the Dream Alive (So lang' man Träume noch leben kann)"

Song by Münchener Freiheit with the London Symphony Orchestra

from the album Fantasy
- Released: 1988
- Genre: Pop
- Length: 4:09
- Label: CBS
- Songwriters: Aron Strobel, Stefan Zauner (music), Timothy Touchton and Curtis Briggs (lyrics)
- Producer: Armand Volker

"Keeping the Dream Alive" is a 1988 song by German pop and rock band Münchener Freiheit – also known as Freiheit in English-speaking countries – taken from their album Fantasy. The music was written by Aron Strobel and Stefan Zauner with lyrics by Timothy Touchton and Curtis Briggs, and the song was arranged by Andrew Powell, Armand Volker and Stefan Zauner. It was recorded in Abbey Road Studios and mastered by Tonstudio Rico Sonderegger, with Volker as the producer. The performance by Münchener Freiheit with the London Symphony Orchestra included featuring additional vocals by the Jackson Singers.

The song was originally recorded in German as "So lang' man Träume noch leben kann", and appeared on the album Fantasie. The lyrics were later translated into English and re-recorded to be released on CBS.

An instrumental version under the original German-language title "So lang' man Träume noch leben kann" appeared in 1987 on Schenk Mir Eine Nacht - Ihre Schönsten Lovesongs.

== Charts ==
It remains the band's only international hit, peaking at #14 in the UK Charts. Because it is the band's only charting hit in the UK, it is generally considered as a one-hit wonder and, due to its December release, a Christmas song, being featured on many Christmas compilation albums.

Chart (1988–89)	Peak position
Australia (Kent Music Report)	55
Ireland (IRMA)	20
UK	14

== Tracklist ==
=== German ===
- Side A: So lang’ man Träume noch leben kann" (Long Version) (6:58)
- Side B:
  - "So lang’ man Träume noch leben kann" (Instrumental Version) (4:14)
  - "So lang’ man Träume noch leben kann" (Single Version) (4:14)

=== English ===
Single

- Side A: "Keeping the Dream Alive" (Single Version) (4:09)
- Side B: "The Land of Fantasy" (4:51)

Maxi single

1. "Keeping the Dream Alive" (Single Version) (4:09)
2. "Keeping the Dream Alive" (Extended Version) (6:31)
3. "The Land of Fantasy" (4:51)

== Popularity ==
Due to its December release and rich orchestral sound, "Keeping the Dream Alive" still receives much airplay at Christmas time in the United Kingdom, and can be found on many Christmas compilation albums. It is also popular with choirs throughout the world.

The song failed to chart in the United States when it was originally released, gaining favour with the American public only after it was featured in the soundtrack for the film Say Anything....

== Cover versions ==
There have been a number of covers of the song both in English and in German.

In 2013, English pop singer Kim Wilde covered the song on her album Wilde Winter Songbook, but only in the deluxe edition of the album.

In 2018, British pop music group The Fizz covered it in their album Christmas with the Fizz.

In 2019, Björn Again covered the song in "Christmas Is Björn Again".

In 2020, Rock Choir covered the song.

== In popular culture ==
The song was featured on the soundtrack of the 1989 film Say Anything... directed by Cameron Crowe.
