= INVU =

INVU may refer to:

- INVU (album), by Taeyeon, 2022
  - "INVU" (song), the title track from the album
- I.N.V.U. (manhwa)
