= Wilde Winter Songbook =

Studio album by Kim Wilde
- Released: 11 November 2013
- Recorded: 2013
- Genre: Christmas
- Length: 39:01
- Label: Wildeflower
- Producer: Ricky Wilde

Kim Wilde chronology
Snapshots (2011)	Wilde Winter Songbook (2013)	Here Come the Aliens (2018)

Wilde Winter Songbook is the thirteenth studio album and first Christmas album by English singer Kim Wilde, released on 11 November 2013 by Wildeflower Records. The album consists of a mix of traditional Christmas songs, covers of contemporary seasonal songs and original music.

== Background ==
Wilde Winter Songbook consists of four Christmas classics, two covers of newer winter-related songs (both from 2008) and six new compositions. The album features duets with Nik Kershaw, Rick Astley, her husband Hal Fowler and her father Marty Wilde.

The four Christmas classics on this album are "Have Yourself a Merry Little Christmas", "Let It Snow", "Rockin' Around the Christmas Tree" and "Winter Wonderland", whereas the cover versions are "Winter Song", originally by Sara Bareilles and Ingrid Michaelson (2008) and "White Winter Hymnal" by Fleet Foxes (2008).

Kim Wilde's daughter, Rose Fowler, sings backing vocals on the song "Hope".

Wilde intended to include the song "Deck The Halls (Angels Sing)" on the album as well, but did not want to have 13 tracks on a Christmas album. The song was eventually released on the deluxe edition of Wilde Winter Songbook in 2015. All of the additional bonus tracks for the deluxe edition were also made available via iTunes on a separate Deluxe EP.

== Promotion ==
Two videos, of the songs "White Winter Hymnal" and "New Life", were created and uploaded to YouTube, showing Wilde and her brother and musicians in a recording studio. She also appeared on The Chris Evans Breakfast Show on BBC Radio 2 on 8 November 2013, where she performed "White Winter Hymnal" among other songs.

Two more videos, for the original composition "Hope" and "Rockin' Around the Christmas Tree", were released in the following weeks, the latter poking fun at her infamous drunken train ride home the year before. In December 2012 Wilde was videotaped with mobile phones singing her hits "Kids in America" and "Rockin' Around the Christmas Tree" on the tube carriage while wearing "reindeer antlers after leaving a boozy festive party". The video went viral on YouTube receiving more than two million views. The promotion video re-enacts this scene showing Wilde on a train singing exactly the same song.

Before the end of December there was published a video for all 12 tracks on the album.

In December she gave interviews for BBC Breakfast, where she performed "Let It Snow" on This Morning and performed "Winter Wonderland" on German television together with Rick Astley.

== Tour ==
Four concerts took place for the Kim Wilde's Christmas Party tour in December 2013, including Saasveld (Netherlands), Bristol (UK), Birmingham (UK) and London (UK).

== Track listing ==
No.	Title	Writer(s)	Length
1.	"Winter Wonderland" (duet with Rick Astley)	Felix Bernard; Richard B. Smith	2:47
2.	"Hope"	Kim Wilde; Ricky Wilde; Mark Cummins	3:56
3.	"One"	K. Wilde	3:30
4.	"Have Yourself a Merry Little Christmas"	Hugh Martin; Ralph Blane	3:14
5.	"Winter Song"	Sara Bareilles; Ingrid Michaelson	4:19
6.	"New Life"	K. Wilde; R. Wilde	3:47
7.	"White Winter Hymnal" (featuring Marty Wilde)	Robin Pecknold	2:26
8.	"Burn Gold (Silent Night)" (featuring Hal Fowler)	K. Wilde; Fowler; traditional	4:22
9.	"Song for Beryl"	K. Wilde; R. Wilde; Cummins	3:15
10.	"Let It Snow"	Sammy Cahn; Jule Styne	2:47
11.	"Hey Mister Snowman"	K. Wilde	2:12
12.	"Rockin' Around the Christmas Tree" (duet with Nik Kershaw)	John David Marks	2:26

Deluxe edition bonus tracks
No.	Title	Writer(s)	Length
13.	"Keeping the Dream Alive"	Stefan Zauner; Aron Strobel; Timothy Touchton; Curtis Briggs	4:15
14.	"Isobel's Dream"	K. Wilde; R. Wilde	4:11
15.	"Deck the Halls (Angels Sing)"	K. Wilde; R. Wilde	2:33
16.	"Last Christmas" (acoustic)	George Michael	3:59
17.	"Hope" (Electric Penguins remix)	K. Wilde; R. Wilde; Cummins	4:39
18.	"Burn Gold" (Electric Penguins remix)	K. Wilde; Fowler	5:04

== Charts ==
Chart (2013)	Peak position
UK Albums (OCC)	169
UK Independent Albums (OCC)	24
