= Runglish =

Russian–English macaronic language

Runglish, Ruslish, Russlish (Russian: рунглиш, руслиш, русслиш), or Russian English, is a language born out of a mixture of the English and Russian language. This is common among Russian speakers who speak English as a second language, and it is mainly spoken in post-Soviet states.

The earliest of these portmanteau words is Russlish, dating from 1971. Appearing later are (chronologically): Russglish (1991), Ruglish (1993), Ringlish (1996), Ruslish (1997), Runglish (1998), Rusglish (1999), and Rusinglish (2015).

As with other "lishes", there is no universally accepted definition of Runglish. The term may refer to English used by native Russian speakers in general, various types of Russian language interference in use of English, heavily hybridized speech of Russian immigrants in English-speaking countries, Russian-English code-switching in bilingual communities, romanization or Englishisation of the Russian language.

Although less widespread than other pidgins and creoles, such as Tok Pisin, Runglish is spoken in a number of English-Russian communities, such as in Southern Australia and most notably the Russian-speaking community of Brighton Beach in Brooklyn, New York. Brighton Beach has been nicknamed Little Odessa due to its population of Russian-speaking immigrants from Ukraine and Russia. Runglish is considered to be used and spoken by at least 130 million people on the level of Russian accent of English language; pure combination of English and Russian words is significantly more rare. This number mainly consists of Russian-speaking immigrants and their descendants.

== Origins ==
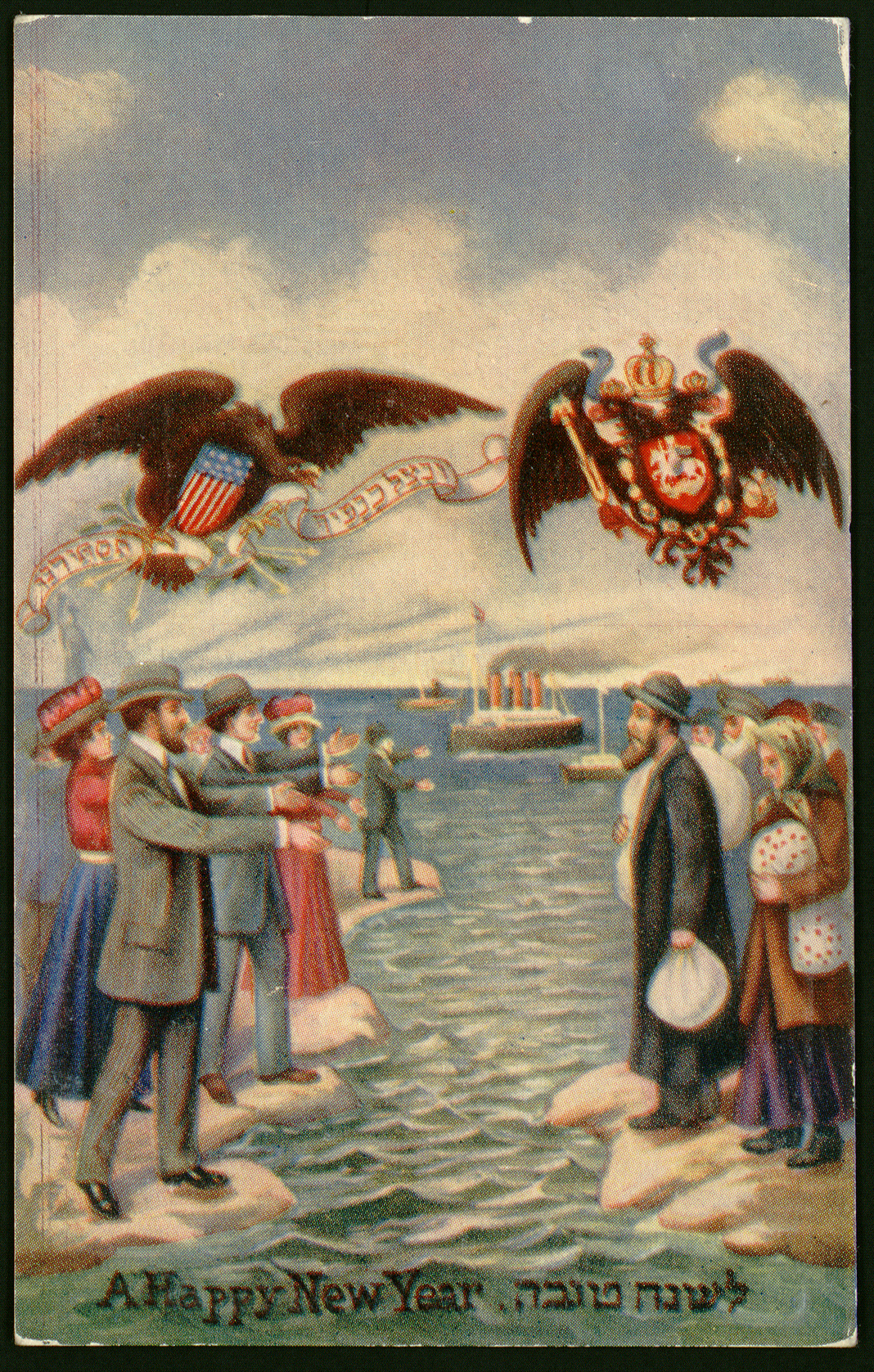
Fleeing Russian Jews welcomed in America

=== History ===
The appearance of Runglish has been caused by a number of social, scientific and political factors from the 19th to 21st centuries.

One of the multiple causes for the blending of the two languages is the increased immigration of Russian speaking communities to the English-speaking parts of the world, and specifically the United States. The main periods of the immigration are the following:

- The Imperial Russian religious prosecutions (pogroms),
- Russian Revolution,
- Russian Civil War,
- Soviet era repressions,
- Post-Soviet period.

The exposure of English to Russian speech and literature continued with the fall of the Soviet Union, as the Iron Curtain had been eliminated, which opened a possibility for international tourism and communication. Additionally important was the expansion of international contacts, the creation of partnerships and alliances in which English was the main language of communication, state computerization, and, most importantly, the introduction of the Internet.

=== Brighton Beach ===
In the United States, Runglish is used in a number of Russian communities. Runglish is particularly popular among the Russian-speaking community in Brighton Beach in New York. Brighton Beach, a small area in New York, is rightfully considered the capital of "Russian English". Before the Great Depression, Brighton Beach used to be a fashionable destination. However, as the economic crisis progressed, luxurious life in the southern part of Brooklyn came to an end, and poor immigrants began populating it instead of wealthy European tourists. For a long time, Brighton Beach was considered to be poor, inaccessible and criminal. Soon, Brighton Beach became a home for many immigrants from all over the world, particularly from the Soviet Union. The arrival of Russian-speaking immigrants helped to gradually develop a former disadvantaged neighbourhood into a powerful community with its own infrastructure, lifestyle and language.

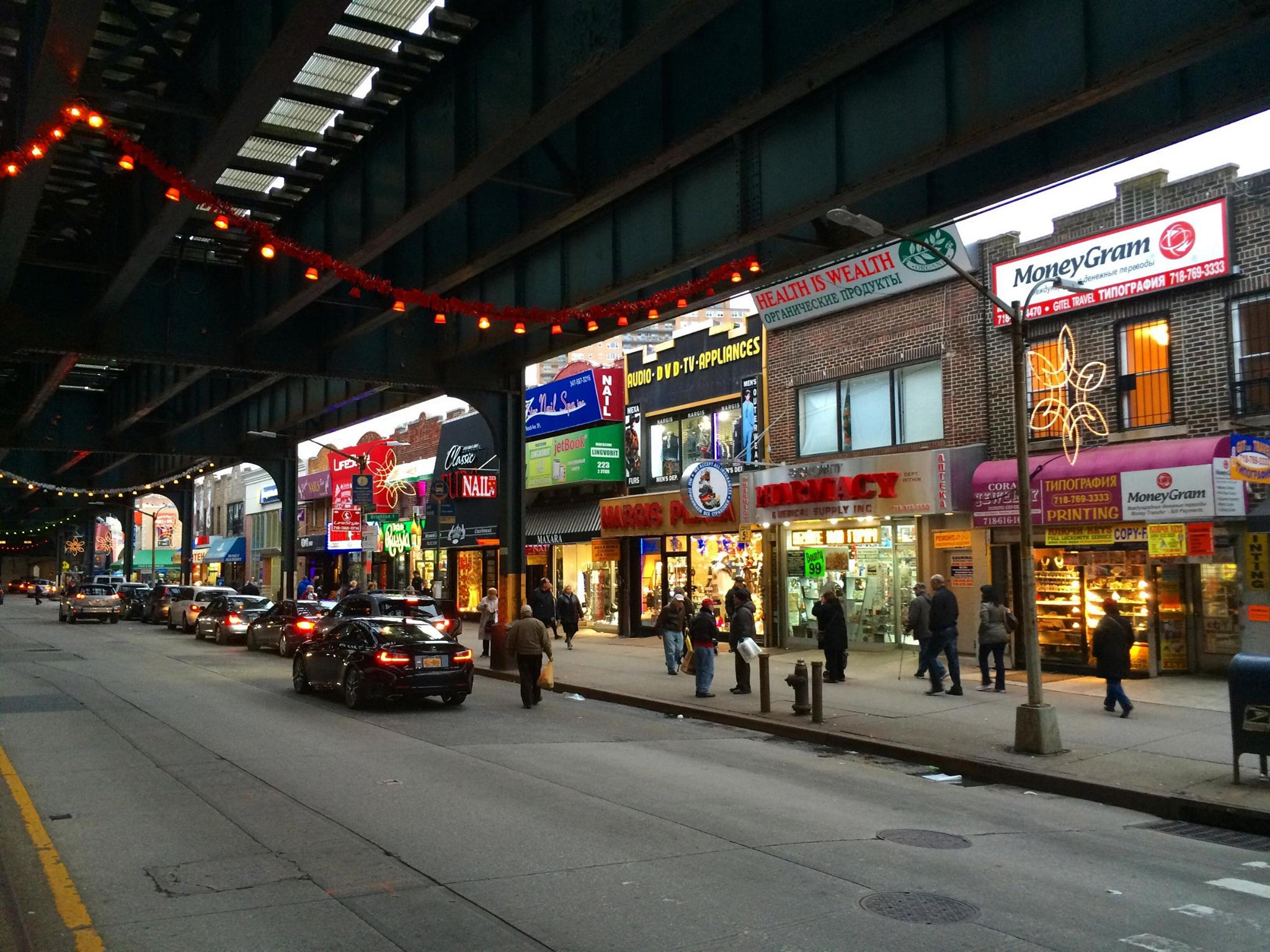
Brighton Beach, New York, has a large Russian-speaking population of immigrants from Ukraine and Russia.

The following are the examples of the Runglish words that are widely used on daily basis in Brighton Beach:

- Driving: Драйвить, Draivit (proper Russian: вести машину/ехать, vyesti mashinu/yekhat)
- Case: Kейс, Keis (proper Russian: портфель-атташе, portfel-attashe, also дело, delo as in legal case)
- Donuts: Донаты, Donaty (proper Russian: пончики, ponchiki)
- Appointments: Аппойнтменты, Appoyntmenty (proper Russian: Назначения [на приём], naznacheniya [na priyom])

=== NASA ===
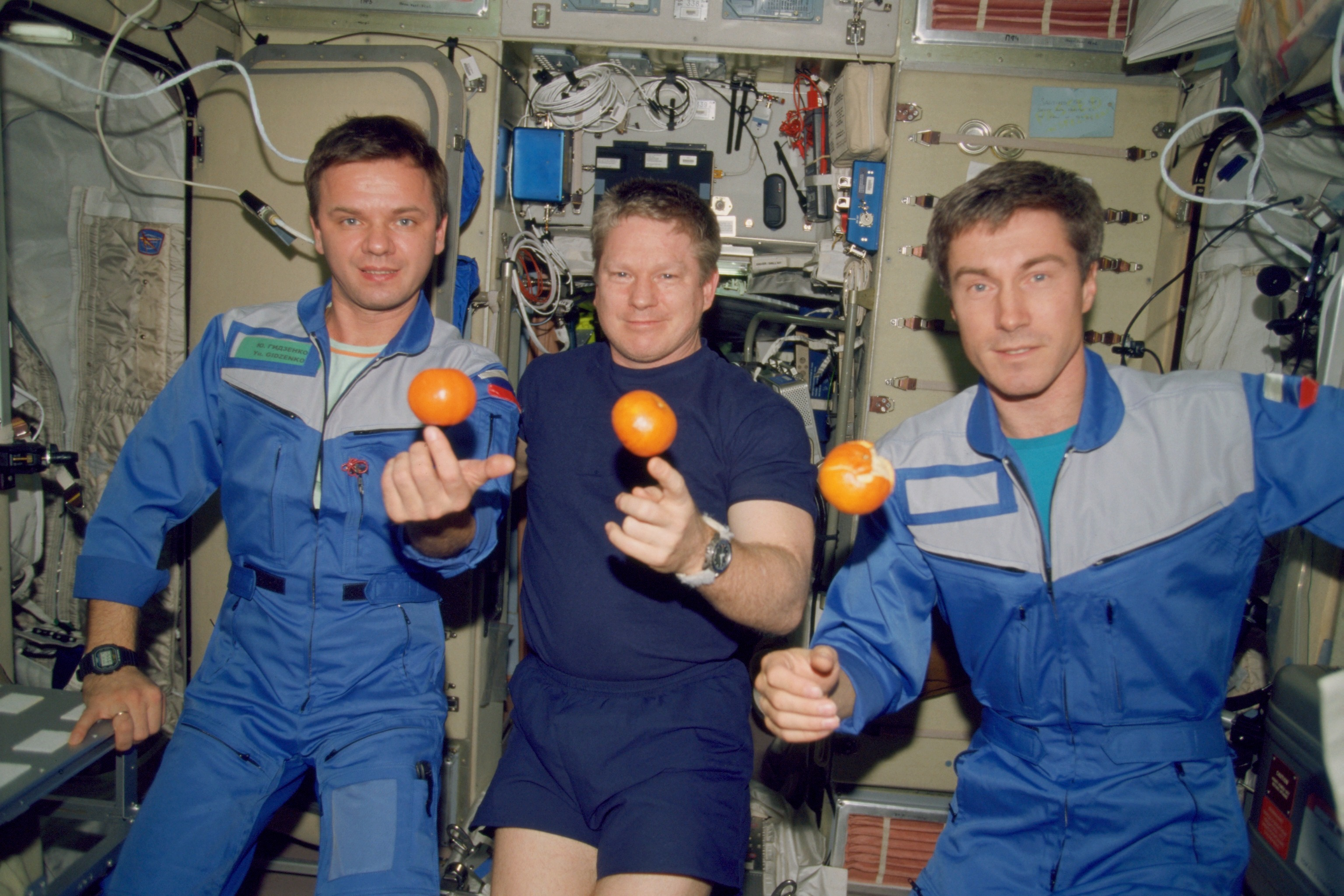
ISS crew: Soyuz Commander Yuri Gidzenko (left), Commander Bill Shepherd (center), and Flight Engineer Sergei Krikalev (right)

The term "Runglish" was popularized by cosmonaut Sergei Krikalev in 2000, describing the way Russian and American cosmonauts spoke on the International Space Station. Krikalev said: "We say jokingly that we communicate in 'Runglish,' a mixture of Russian and English languages, so that when we are short of words in one language we can use the other, because all the crew members speak both languages well." Ever since, NASA has begun listing Runglish as one of the on-board languages.

== In culture ==
Runglish is widely used in poetry (Vladimir Mayakovsky "American Russians"), music (Splean "My English-Russian dictionary") and in prose (Arthur С. Clarke's 1982 novel, 2010: Odyssey Two"). A monthly published periodical called Wind—New Zealand Russian existed from 1996 to 2003.

=== Literature ===
A small subplot in Arthur C. Clarke's novel 2010: Odyssey Two concerned the crew of a Russo-American spaceship, who attempted to break down boredom with a Stamp Out Russlish!! campaign. As the story went, both crews were fully fluent in each other's languages, to the point that they found themselves crossing over languages in mid-conversation, or even simply speaking the other language even when there was no-one who had it as their native tongue present. Robert A. Heinlein's novel The Moon Is a Harsh Mistress is written in the heavily Russian-influenced English (much Russian vocabulary, some Russian grammar) of a joint Australian/Russian penal colony on the Moon.

=== A Clockwork Orange ===
The 1962 novel A Clockwork Orange by Anthony Burgess is partially written in a Russian-influenced argot called "Nadsat", which takes its name from the Russian suffix that is equivalent to '-teen' in English. The language in the novel is a secret, used as boundary separating the teen world from the adult. There are multiple examples of the words used by teenagers in the novel:

- droog - друг - friend;
- ooko - ухо - ear;
- oomny - умный - smart;
- oozhassny - ужасный - horrible/awful;
- oozy - цепь (узы) - chain/bond;
- osoosh - осушать/вытирать - drain/wipe;
- otchkies – очки - glasses.
- korova - корова - cow (found in the movie version)
- moloko+ - молоко плюс - milk plus (found in the movie version)

Even though "Nadsat" is a fictional constructed language that is very different from Runglish, it exemplifies a common usage of a slang combining the English and Russian languages.

== Examples ==
Words in Runglish may be created in the following ways:

1. Loan translation or calque, i.e. a word or phrase borrowed from another language by literal, word-for-word or root-for-root translation. For example: аккаунт (account - учетная запись), брифинг (briefing – информационное совещание), трафик (traffic – дорожное движение), спичрайтер (speechwriter – составитель текстовых речей), мануал (User's manual - инструкция по применению), адаптер (adapter – переходник), коннектор (connector – соединитель, soyedinitel), cплиттер (splitter – разветвитель, razvetvitel)
2. Borrowing of English abbreviations "as if those were words": АСАП (ASAP – “as soon as possible” - как можно быстрее), ИМХО (IMHO – “in my humble opinion” – по моему скромному мнению), бтв (BTW – "by the way" – если что), ЛЭД (LED – light-emitting diode; in Russian: светодиод, svyetodiod) etc.
3. Confusion of languages in phrases like that: забукать номер в отеле (to book – зарезервировать), зачекиниться в аэропорту (to check in – зарегистрироваться);
4. Hybrids, i.e. words formed by joining the foreign roots of Russian suffixes, prefixes and endings, for example:

юзать (to use - использовать),
зафрендить (to befriend),
пофиксить (to fix - исправить),
пошерить (to share – делиться),
прочекапить (to check up - проверить);

Linguists have highlighted the following spheres, where Runglish is actively used:

1. Designation of new activities and professions, e.g. «мерчендайзер» (merchandiser), «фрилансер» (freelancer), «менеджер» (manager), «супервайзер» (supervisor), «ютубер» (YouTuber);
2. Designation of new areas of human knowledge: «блог» (blog), «пиар» (PR), «промоушн» (promotion);
3. Designation of items: «лэптоп»/«ноутбук» (laptop), «мэйкап» (make-up), «постер» (poster), «чипы» (microchips), «чипсы» (potato chips); «Джиэсэм» (GSM cell-phone network)
4. Designation of terms to give them prestige: «джоб-оффер» ("job offer"), «cателлит» ("satellite", as in "satellite city");
5. Designation of musical genres: «транс» (trance), «фолк» (folk), «рэп» (rap), «эмбиент» (ambient), «ар-эн-би» (R'n'B), «фьюжн» (fusion jazz), «лаунж» (lounge music), «дип хауз» (deep house).

Some Russian brands use an English name to imply some "Western", Occidental concept used.

- "Fix Price" convenience stores are a prime example of this logic. The store chain initially introduced the "everything costs X rubles" concept of fixed price (similar to the "Everything 99 cents" stores or the "Dollar tree").

== Runglish in Russia ==
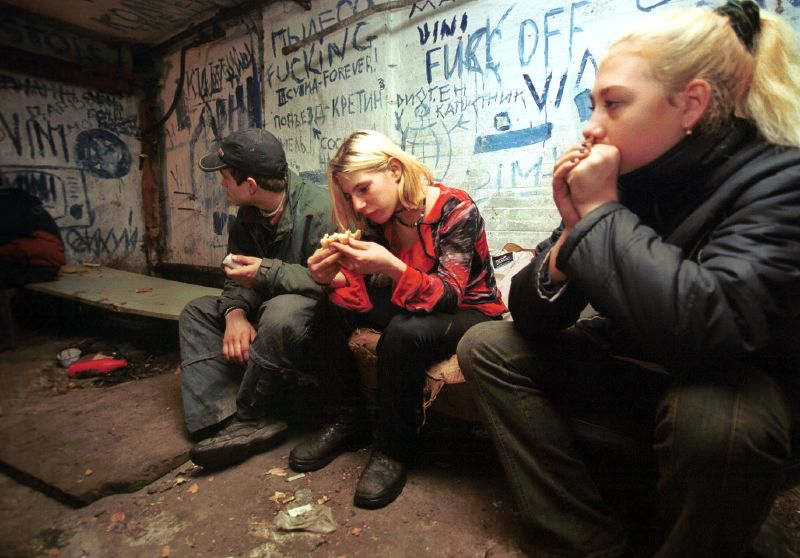
Mixed Russian-English grafitii

With increased globalization after the dissolution of the Soviet Union, English has made its way into the languages used in Russia, Ukraine, Belarus, and other former Soviet states. Runglish is used to talk about politics, economics, and other areas of modern life, often appearing in Russian-language news articles and headlines. (Note: For example: «Снегопад в России: травмы, пробки и блэкаут» ("Snowfall in Russia: Injuries, Traffic Jams, and Blackout").) English is considered more prestigious, and English loanwords may be used to demonstrate one's level of education and involvement in the global community.

Young people are major contributors to the popularization of Runglish. Anglicisms are an essential part of the youth vocabulary, and are becoming increasingly fixed within the language. Despite this, some Russians feel that it is important to preserve the framework of rules of the Russian language.

== Criticism ==
The opinions of linguists on the effects of Runglish are divided. Whether some argue that incorporation of foreign words into Russian language enriches it and broadens the culture, others claim that "the large-scale penetration of English is destroying the system of the Russian language, its identity and culture".

In 2006, Vladimir Putin signed the decree "On holding a year of the Russian language". Following that, 2007 had been declared the "Year of the Russian Language" in Russia and abroad, in order to promote the importance and beauty of Russian and limit the usage of foreign words. The rector of A. Pushkin State Institute of the Russian Language Yuri Prokhorov admitted that it was impossible to stop the tendency of the widespread use of foreign terms. However, he believed that the bigger issue was that a large number of Russians could not use their own language correctly.
