= Fantasio (disambiguation) =

Fantasio is a fictional character from the Spirou et Fantasio comic strip.

Fantasio may also refer to:

- Fantasio (magician)
- Fantasio (opera), opera composed by Jacques Offenbach
- Fantasio (Smyth), opera composed by Ethel Smyth
- Fantasio, play by Alfred de Musset
- Fantasio Piccoli (1917–1981), Italian stage director

== See also ==
- Fantasia (disambiguation)
- Fantasy (disambiguation)
- Phantasia (disambiguation)
- Phantasio, professional wrestler
