= Fantasista =

Fantasista may refer to:

- Fantasista (manga), Japanese manga series
- Fantasista (association football), an advanced playmaker in association football
- "Fantasista" (song), the tenth maxi single by Dragon Ash
- Fantasista Doll, a 2013 anime series
- Fantasista Utamaro, Japanese artist

== See also ==
- Fantasia (disambiguation)
- Fantasist
