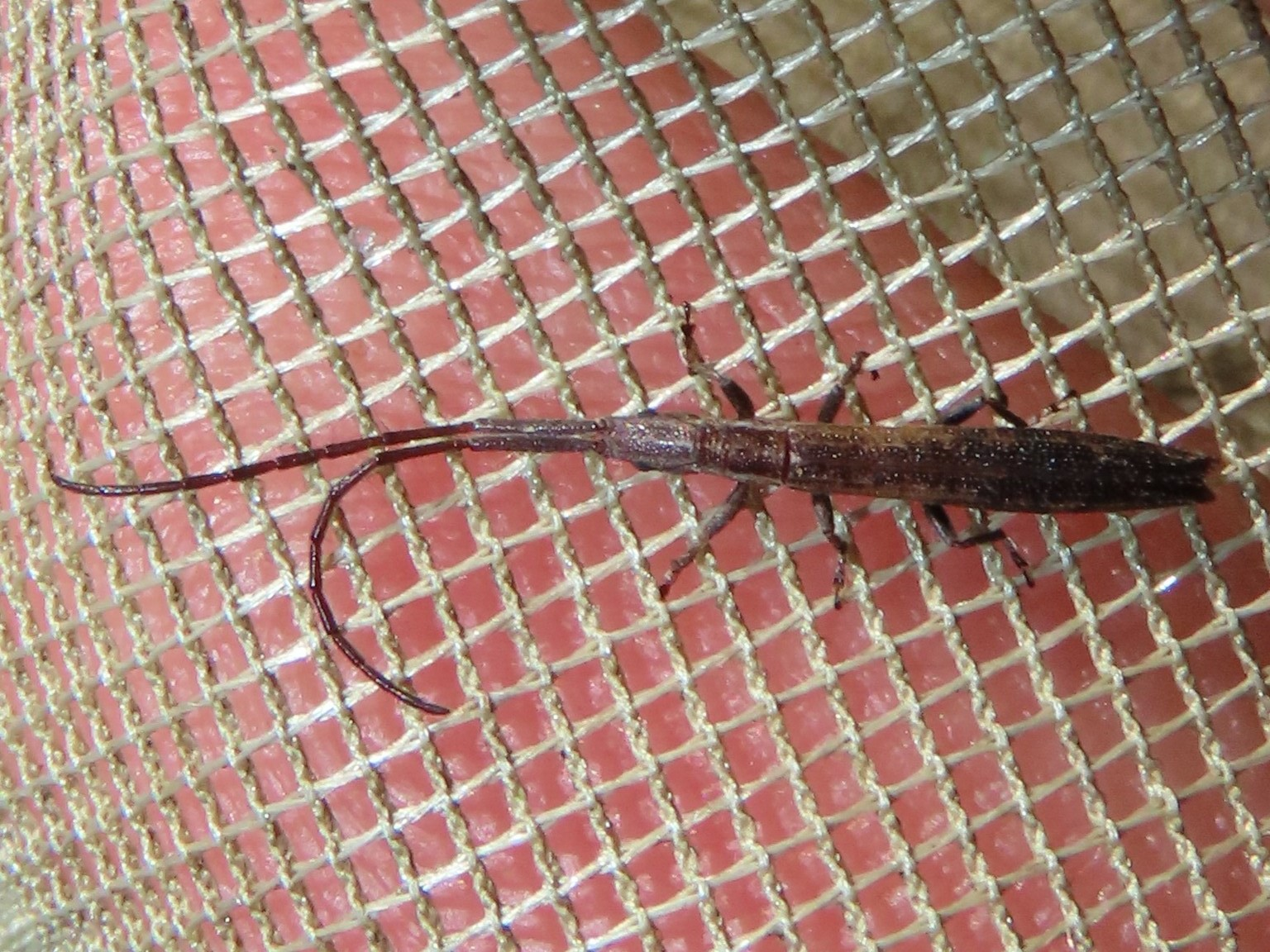

Scientific classification
- Domain: Eukaryota
- Kingdom: Animalia
- Phylum: Arthropoda
- Class: Insecta
- Order: Coleoptera
- Suborder: Polyphaga
- Infraorder: Cucujiformia
- Family: Cerambycidae
- Genus: Spalacopsis
- Species: S. stolata

Binomial name
- Spalacopsis stolata Newman, 1842

Synonyms
- Spalacopsis pertenuis

= Spalacopsis stolata =

Species of beetle

Spalacopsis stolata is a species of beetle in the family, Cerambycidae. It was first described by Newman in 1842.

== Range ==
It is native to the Continental US.
