= Spalacopsis grandis =

Scientific classification
- Domain: Eukaryota
- Kingdom: Animalia
- Phylum: Arthropoda
- Class: Insecta
- Order: Coleoptera
- Suborder: Polyphaga
- Infraorder: Cucujiformia
- Family: Cerambycidae
- Genus: Spalacopsis
- Species: S. grandis

Binomial name
- Spalacopsis grandis (Chevrolat, 1862)

Species of beetle

Spalacopsis grandis is a species of beetle in the family Cerambycidae. It was first described by Chevrolat in 1862.
