= Fantasia =

Fantasia may refer to:

== Film and television ==
- Fantasia (1940 film), an animated musical film produced by Walt Disney
  - Fantasia 2000, a sequel to the 1940 film
- Fantasia (2004 film), a Hong Kong comedy film
- Fantasia (2014 film), a Chinese film
- "Fantasia" (Eureka Seven episode)
- Fantasia International Film Festival, a film festival in Montreal
- Fantasia, a fictional world in the NeverEnding Story films
- Fantasia (television program), a Brazilian television program

== Games ==
- Fantasia (video game), a 1991 game for the Sega Mega Drive based on the Disney film
- Fantasia: Music Evolved, a 2014 music rhythm game for the Xbox One and Xbox 360 Kinect based on the Disney film
- Fantasia, a fictional realm in Chocobo Racing and a level in that game
- Fantasia (performance), traditional horsemanship exhibition in the Maghreb.

== Music ==
- Fantasia (musical form), a free musical composition structured according to the composer's fancy
  - Fantasia No. 3 (Mozart), a 1782 piece of music for solo piano composed by Wolfgang Amadeus Mozart
  - Fantasia in F minor (Schubert), an 1828 piano piece for four hands composed by Franz Schubert
  - Fantasia contrappuntistica, a solo piano piece composed by Ferruccio Busoni
  - Fantasia on a Theme by Thomas Tallis, a 1910 composition by Ralph Vaughan Williams
  - Fantasia on British Sea Songs, a composition by Sir Henry Wood
  - Fantasía para un gentilhombre, a 1954 work by Joaquín Rodrigo
- Fantasia (singer) (born 1984), American R&B singer and actress
- Show tango or fantasia, a more theatrical and exaggerated form of the Argentine tango

=== Albums ===
- Fantasia (Eliane Elias album) (1992)
- Fantasia (Fantasia album) (2006)
- Fantasía (Franco De Vita album) (1986)
- Fantasia (Hi-Fi Un!corn album) (2024)
- Fantasía (Yolandita Monge album) (1980)
- Fantasia, a 2012 album by Yuja Wang
- Fantasia x a 2020 album by Monsta X

=== Songs ===
- "Fantasia", a 1967 song by Mario Merola
- "Fantasia", a 2020 song by Monsta X from the album Fantasia X
- "Fantasiaa", the Finnish entry in the Eurovision Song Contest 1983, performed by Ami Aspelund
- "Fantasías", a 2019 song by Rauw Alejandro and Farruko

== Ships ==
- Fantasia 27, a French sailboat design
- MSC Fantasia, a cruise ship operated by MSC Cruises
  - Fantasia-class cruise ship, a class of three cruise ships operated by MSC Cruises
- MS SeaFrance Cézanne or MS Fantasia, a cross-channel ferry operated by SNCF
- MS Stena Fantasia or MS Fantasia, a cross-channel ferry operated by Sealink and Stena Line
- TSS Duke of York (1935) or Fantasia, a cruise ship operated by Chandris Line

== Other uses ==
- Fantasia, a 1939 novel by Warwick Deeping
- Fantasia (comics), a character in the Marvel Universe
- Fantasia (franchise), an American media franchise owned by the Walt Disney Company
- Fantasia Holdings, a property developer in China
- Fantasia (performance), a traditional equestrian performance practiced in North Africa
- Fantasia (wrestler), American professional wrestler
- 1224 Fantasia, an asteroid
- Bebearia phantasia or fantasia, a butterfly in the family Nymphalidae

== People with the surname ==
- Orazio Fantasia (born 1995), Australian footballer
- Rick Fantasia, American sociologist

== See also ==
- Fantasio (disambiguation)
- Fantasy (disambiguation)
- Fantazia (disambiguation)
- Phantasia (disambiguation)
