= Spalacopsis variegata =

Scientific classification
- Domain: Eukaryota
- Kingdom: Animalia
- Phylum: Arthropoda
- Class: Insecta
- Order: Coleoptera
- Suborder: Polyphaga
- Infraorder: Cucujiformia
- Family: Cerambycidae
- Genus: Spalacopsis
- Species: S. variegata

Binomial name
- Spalacopsis variegata Bates, 1880

Species of beetle

Spalacopsis variegata is a species of beetle in the family Cerambycidae. It was first described by Henry Walter Bates in 1880.
