= Spalacopsis macra =

Scientific classification
- Domain: Eukaryota
- Kingdom: Animalia
- Phylum: Arthropoda
- Class: Insecta
- Order: Coleoptera
- Suborder: Polyphaga
- Infraorder: Cucujiformia
- Family: Cerambycidae
- Genus: Spalacopsis
- Species: S. macra

Binomial name
- Spalacopsis macra Tyson, 1973

Species of beetle

Spalacopsis macra is a species of beetle in the family Cerambycidae. It was first described by Tyson in 1973.
