= Spalacopsis unicolor =

Scientific classification
- Domain: Eukaryota
- Kingdom: Animalia
- Phylum: Arthropoda
- Class: Insecta
- Order: Coleoptera
- Suborder: Polyphaga
- Infraorder: Cucujiformia
- Family: Cerambycidae
- Genus: Spalacopsis
- Species: S. unicolor

Binomial name
- Spalacopsis unicolor Tyson, 1973

Species of beetle

Spalacopsis unicolor is a species of beetle in the family Cerambycidae. It was first described by Tyson in 1973.
