= Spalacopsis =

Scientific classification
- Domain: Eukaryota
- Kingdom: Animalia
- Phylum: Arthropoda
- Class: Insecta
- Order: Coleoptera
- Suborder: Polyphaga
- Infraorder: Cucujiformia
- Family: Cerambycidae
- Genus: Spalacopsis; Newman, 1842

Synonyms
- Eutheia Dejean, 1835; Euthuorus Jacquelin du Val, 1857; Spacalopsis LeConte, 1852; Systene Pascoe, 1858

Genus of beetles

Spalacopsis is a genus of beetles in the family Cerambycidae, containing the following species:

- Spalacopsis chemsaki Tyson, 1973
- Spalacopsis filum (Klug, 1829)
- Spalacopsis fusca Gahan, 1892
- Spalacopsis grandis (Chevrolat, 1862)
- Spalacopsis howdeni Tyson, 1970
- Spalacopsis lobata Breuning, 1942
- Spalacopsis macra Tyson, 1973
- Spalacopsis ornatipennis Fisher, 1935
- Spalacopsis phantasma Bates, 1885
- Spalacopsis protensa (Pascoe, 1871)
- Spalacopsis similis Gahan, 1892
- Spalacopsis spinipennis Fisher, 1936
- Spalacopsis stolata Newman, 1842
- Spalacopsis suffusa Newman, 1842
- Spalacopsis texana Casey, 1891
- Spalacopsis unicolor Tyson, 1973
- Spalacopsis variegata Bates, 1880
