= Phantasia =

Phantasia may refer to:

== Concepts ==
- Phantasiai, a concept in Hellenistic philosophy
- Lexis (Aristotle), a philosophical concept used by Aristotle
- Hyperphantasia, the phenomenon of experiencing extremely vivid mental imagery

== Arts and society ==
- Phantasia (album)
- Phantasia (poet), a fictitious ancient Egyptian poet, said to have been the creator of the Iliad and Odyssey
- Phantasia Press, a publisher of science fiction books
- Phantasialand, theme park in Germany
- Tales of Phantasia, part of the Tales series of games published by Namco
- Phantasia (role-playing game)
- Girls' Generation's Phantasia, Girls' Generation 2015 tour

== See also ==
- Fantasia (disambiguation)
- Fantasio (disambiguation)
- Aphantasia
