= Spalacopsis howdeni =

Scientific classification
- Domain: Eukaryota
- Kingdom: Animalia
- Phylum: Arthropoda
- Class: Insecta
- Order: Coleoptera
- Suborder: Polyphaga
- Infraorder: Cucujiformia
- Family: Cerambycidae
- Genus: Spalacopsis
- Species: S. howdeni

Binomial name
- Spalacopsis howdeni Tyson, 1970

Species of beetle

Spalacopsis howdeni is a species of beetle in the family Cerambycidae. It was first described by W.H. Tyson in 1970. It is native to America north of Mexico and West Indies.
