= Korova =

Korova may refer to:

- Korovakill, an Austrian band formerly named Korova
- Korova (record label), a record label
- Korova (Liverpool), a bar in Liverpool, England
- The Russian-language title of The Cow (1989 film), an animated short film by Aleksandr Petrov
- Korova Milk Bar, a central location in the novel A Clockwork Orange and its adaptations.
