= Fantasy (Münchener Freiheit album) =

Studio album by Münchener Freiheit
- Released: 1988
- Recorded: 1988
- Genre: Pop
- Length: 40:27
- Label: CBS
- Producer: Armand Volker

Münchener Freiheit chronology
Fantasie (1988)	Fantasy (1988)	Purpurmond (1989)

Fantasy is a 1988 album by German pop group Münchener Freiheit, known simply as Freiheit for this and their other English-language releases. It was the band's second album to be recorded in English, following 1987's Romancing in the Dark, and contains English versions of all of the tracks from their fifth studio album, Fantasie, also released in 1988.

The album contains the international hit single, "Keeping the Dream Alive", which gave the band their only hit in the United Kingdom, peaking at number 14 in the UK Singles Chart. The song also gave them moderate exposure in the United States after being featured in the 1989 film Say Anything....

== Critical reception ==
Professional ratings
Review scores
Source	Rating
AllMusic	2/5 stars

In a review for AllMusic, Evan Cater described the album as "first-rate new-wave Europop", with "rich, sweeping synthesizer and guitar arrangements [...] mated with hummable hooks and gorgeous harmonies rendered in [lead singer] Stefan Zauner's electronically enhanced waif-like vocals". He described lead single "Keeping the Dream Alive" as being "Beatlesque" and featuring "a spot-on orchestral arrangement". He went on to describe the tracks "Kissed You in the Rain" and "Tears Are a Girl's Best Friend" as being "similarly sweeping power-pop songs, painted in broad and generous strokes", though "the relentlessly panoramic scope of Armand Volker's production grows a little burdensome by the end of the album." Cater concludes the review by opining that producer Volker achieves "some measure of balance in quieter tunes like "Diana" and "Moonlight" and that "it's well worth putting up with the album's frothy excesses in order to experience Freiheit's fine pop craftmanship".

== Track listing ==
All music by Stefan Zauner and Aron Strobel, except "So Good" (Stefan Zauner and Michael Kunzi). All lyrics by Tim Touchton and Curtis Briggs, except "The Land of Fantasy", "Tears Are a Girl's Best Friend" and "So Good" (Touchton) and "On the Run to Be Free" (Briggs).

No.	Title	Length
1.	"Keeping the Dream Alive"	4:16
2.	"Kissed You in the Rain"	3:48
3.	"Diana"	4:17
4.	"The Land of Fantasy"	4:55
5.	"Moonlight"	3:11
6.	"Tears Are a Girl's Best Friend"	4:56
7.	"So Good"	4:08
8.	"Forever and a Day"	3:20
9.	"Poor Little Boy"	3:28
10.	"On the Run to Be Free"	4:08
11.	"Keeping the Dream Alive" (Extended Version)	6:33

Note

- Track 11 not on LP, cassette or US CD versions.

== Personnel ==
Freiheit

- Stefan Zauner – vocals
- Aron Strobel – guitar
- Michael Kunzi – bass guitar
- Alex Grünwald – keyboards
- Rennie Hatzke – drums

Other musicians

- London Symphony Orchestra – orchestra (tracks 1 & 11)
- The Jackson Singers – background vocals (tracks 1 & 11)

Technical

- Armand Volker – producer (all tracks), arrangement (tracks 1 & 11)
- Stefan Zauner – arrangement (tracks 1 & 11)
- Andrew Powell – arrangement and conductor (tracks 1 & 11)
- London Symphony Orchestra recorded at Abbey Road Studios, London
- Mike Schmidt at Ink Studios – cover
- Dieter Eikelpoth – photography
