= Spalacopsis suffusa =

Scientific classification
- Kingdom: Animalia
- Phylum: Arthropoda
- Clade: Pancrustacea
- Class: Insecta
- Order: Coleoptera
- Suborder: Polyphaga
- Infraorder: Cucujiformia
- Family: Cerambycidae
- Genus: Spalacopsis
- Species: S. suffusa

Binomial name
- Spalacopsis suffusa Newman, 1842

Species of beetle

Spalacopsis suffusa is a species of beetle in the family Cerambycidae. It was first described by Newman in 1842.
