= Spalacopsis texana =

Scientific classification
- Kingdom: Animalia
- Phylum: Arthropoda
- Class: Insecta
- Order: Coleoptera
- Suborder: Polyphaga
- Infraorder: Cucujiformia
- Family: Cerambycidae
- Genus: Spalacopsis
- Species: S. texana

Binomial name
- Spalacopsis texana Casey, 1891

Species of beetle

Spalacopsis texana is a species of beetle in the family Cerambycidae. It was first described by Casey in 1891.
