= Münchener Freiheit (band) =

German pop band

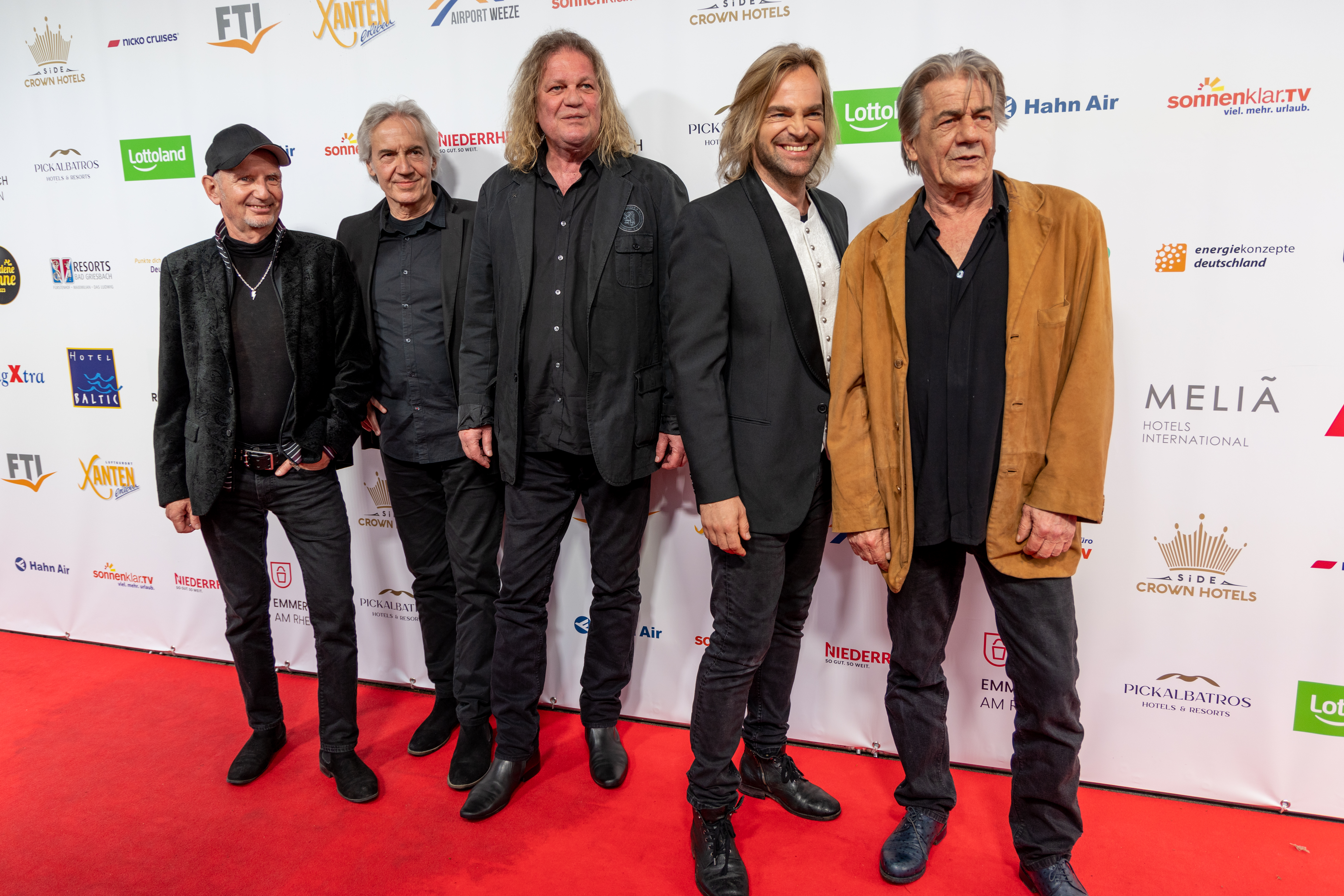
- Münchener Freiheit in 2023

Background information
- Origin: Germany
- Genres: Pop; Rock; Pop rock Schlager; Neue Deutsche Welle; Synthpop
- Years active: 1980–present
- Labels: CBS Schallplatten; Crocodile Music
- Members: Tim Wilhelm; Aron Strobel; Michael Kunzi; Alex Grünwald; Rennie Hatzke
- Past members: Stefan Zauner; Freddie Erdmann; Günter Stolz
- Website: muenchenerfreiheit.de

Münchener Freiheit (known sometimes simply as Freiheit) is a German pop and rock band that had released nineteen studio albums by 2016, four of which have gone gold. They are named after a square in the city of Munich, meaning "Munich freedom". They are considered part of the Neue Deutsche Welle musical movement.

They are best known in the English-speaking world for their single "Keeping the Dream Alive". This song became a #14 hit single in the UK Singles Chart when released in December 1988, making Münchener Freiheit a one-hit wonder there.

== History ==
=== The early years ===
The band, composed of Stefan Zauner (vocals, keyboards), Aron Strobel (guitar and vocals), Rennie Hatzke (drums), Michael Kunzi (bass and vocals), and Alex Grünwald (keyboard), formed in the early 1980s. Their first album Umsteiger, released in 1982, was a rough-around-the-edges form of new wave showing an aggressive side to Zauner's otherwise smooth vocals. This was followed a year later by Licht, which took them in a more synthpop direction. The band's next album Herzschlag einer Stadt in 1984 was a more commercial new wave record, which spawned a Top 30 hit in West Germany, "Oh Baby".

=== Breakthrough ===
The band's first big hit album came in 1986 with Von Anfang an, meaning "from the beginning". Living up to its title, the album contained a selection of new singles, a previously unreleased live version of "Zeig mir die Nacht" (from Umsteiger), two remixes and the occasional track from their previous two albums. Its success was due largely to its two original hit singles, "Ohne dich (schlaf ich heut Nacht nicht ein)" and "Tausendmal du".

=== The international years ===
Following the success of Von Anfang an and its follow-up, Traumziel, the band aimed for international success and began recording tracks from both albums in English. The result was Romancing in the Dark, containing English version of six tracks from Traumziel plus their three biggest West German hits. On this and subsequent English-language albums, the band was credited simply as Freiheit. The majority of the English lyrics were written by the band themselves with some assistance from outside lyricists. (Later the band relied on English lyrics written by professional lyricists Tim Touchton and Curtis Briggs.) The album was released throughout Europe, and there were big hits in Greece (where "Every Time" was a number one single), Sweden, Norway and the Netherlands.

In 1988, Münchener Freiheit released Fantasie in West Germany and its English counterpart, Fantasy. Unlike Romancing in the Dark, Fantasy contained all tracks from its German counterpart. The album went un-noticed throughout the US but was moderately successful in Europe. Freiheit never again released an English album in the US. However, in their homeland, Fantasie was a great success spending eight weeks in the Top 10 peaking at number four and spawning two Top 15 singles: "So lang' man Träume noch leben kann" and "Bis wir uns wiederseh'n". "Keeping the Dream Alive" is the English-language version of "So lang' man Träume noch leben kann". This single became the band's sole hit in the UK, reaching number 14 in the UK singles chart in December 1988.

Their follow-up, Purpurmond, was the last album to be re-recorded in English under the title Love is No Science. Nine of its eleven tracks were re-recorded in English, along with a second re-recording of "Tausendmal Du", this time entitled "All I Can Do".

=== 1991–present ===
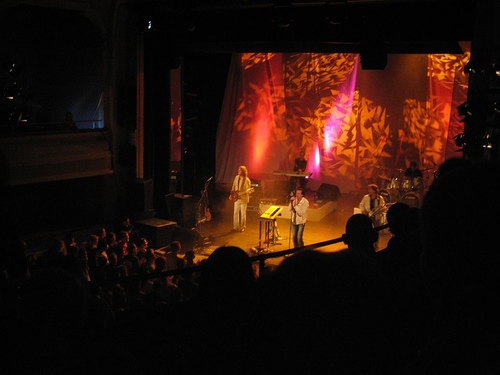
Münchener Freiheit live in concert at Alte Oper from Erfurt, in March 2006

Although 1991 was a quiet year for the band, Zauner and Strobel were still active, releasing the album Living in the Sun under the name of Deuces Wild. The album was recorded in English with most of the lyrics written by Tim Touchton, who had worked with the band since Fantasy.

Despite the moderate reception of Purpurmond, the band returned to the German Top 10 in 1992 with Liebe auf den ersten Blick, earning a Top 15 hit with the title track. The band also represented their country in the Eurovision Song Contest 1993, finishing in 18th place with their song, "Viel zu weit". The band returned a year later with the album Energie (1994), which gave them another Top 30 album in Germany, although their next two albums, Entführ' mich (1996) and Schatten (1998; with a sleeve design by Klaus Voormann), failed to chart at all.

Leaving Sony Music for the EastWest label, the band moved towards conventional dance-pop on their next album, Freiheit die ich meine (2000). The album saw the band re-enter the German Top 50 following their two album absence. The band changed labels again to Koch International, releasing the albums Wachgeküsst (2002) and Geile Zeit (2004). Although these albums used a similar 'radio-friendly' formula to Freiheit die ich meine, both albums peaked in the lower regions of the German Top 100.

Münchener Freiheit continue to record and tour, celebrating their 25th anniversary with the Double CD retrospective Alle Jahre, Alle Hits (2005) and a new single, "Du bist das Leben". Stefan Zauner left the band in 2012 to pursue producing solo-albums; his latest CD is Zeitgefühl (2012). Tim Wilhelm replaced Zauner as a singer in the band.

== Discography ==
=== German-language studio albums ===
Year	Album	English translation	Peak positions			Certification
Year	Album	English translation	GER	AUT	SWI	Certification
1982	Umsteiger	Changer	—	—	—	
1983	Licht	Light	—	—	—	
1984	Herzschlag einer Stadt	Heartbeat of a City	—	—	—	
1986	Traumziel	Dream Destination	15	—	—	GER: Gold
1988	Fantasie	Fantasy	4	29	14	GER: Gold
1989	Purpurmond	Magenta Moon	17	—	—	GER: Gold
1992	Liebe auf den ersten Blick	Love at First Sight	7	21	38	GER: Gold
1994	Energie	Energy	28	—	—	
1996	Entführ' mich	Kidnap Me	—	—	—	
1998	Schatten	Shadows	—	—	—	
2000	Freiheit die ich meine	Freedom That I Mean	46	—	—	
2002	Wachgeküsst	Kissed Awake	76	—	—	
2003	Zeitmaschine	Time Machine	85	—	—	
2004	Geile Zeit	Great Time	82	—	—	
2007	XVII	XVII (17)	57	—	—	
2007	Eigene Wege	Own Ways	10	—	—	
2010	Ohne Limit	Without Limit	60	—	—	
2013	Mehr	More	—	—	—	
2016	Schwerelos	Weightless	—	—	—	

=== German-language live albums ===
Year	Album	English translation	Peak positions			Certification
Year	Album	English translation	GER	AUT	SWI	Certification
1990	Freiheit Live!	Freiheit Live!	—	—	—	
1990	Live in der Grossen Freiheit		69	—	—	
2005	Alle Jahre-Alle Hits (DVD of live concert, 24 February 2005)	All Years – All Hits	—	—	—	

=== German-language compilations ===
Year	Album	Peak positions			Certification
Year	Album	GER	AUT	SWI	Certification
1986	Von Anfang an	6	13	6	GER: Gold
1992	Ihr großten Hits	18	—	—	GER: Gold
1994	Schenk mir eine Nacht (Ihre schönsten Lovesongs)	56	—	—	
1998	Definitive Collection (1998)	—	—	—	
2003	Definitive Collection (2003)	—	—	—	
2005	Alle Jahre – Alle Hits – Die Singles	82	—	—	
2007	Die Hits der 80er	—	—	—	
2008	Hit Collection	—	—	—	
2009	Das beste aus 40 Jahren Hitparade	—	—	—	
2009	Maxis, Hits & Raritäten	—	—	—	
2010	Alle Jahre – Alle Hits – 30 Jahre Münchener Freiheit	—	—	—	
2010	Ihre besten Lieder 1980–2010	—	—	—	

=== German-language singles ===
Year	Album	Peak positions			Album
Year	Album	GER	AUT	SWI	Album
1984	"Oh Baby"	23	—	—	Herzschlag einer Stadt
1985	"Ohne dich (schlaf ich heut Nacht nicht ein)"	2 (Gold)	1	1	Von Anfang an
1986	"Tausendmal du"	9	7	25	Von Anfang an
1986	"Es gibt kein nächstes Mal"	24	—	—	Traumziel
1987	"Herz aus Glas"	24	—	—	Traumziel
1987	"So lang' man Träume noch leben kann"	2	—	17	Fantasie
1988	"Bis wir uns wiedersehn"	11	—	—	Fantasie
1988	"So heiß"	47	—	—	Fantasie
1989	"Verlieben verlieren"	31	—	—	Purpurmond
1990	"Ich will dich nochmal"	50	—	—	Purpurmond
1990	"Komm zurück"	54	—	—	Freiheit Live!
1991	"Liebe auf den ersten Blick"	16	—	31	Liebe auf den ersten Blick
1992	"Einfach wahr"	52	—	—	Liebe auf den ersten Blick
1992	"Einmal kommt das Leben"	62	—	—	Ihre Größten Hits
1993	"Tausend Augen"	52	—	—	Ihre Größten Hits
1993	"Viel zu weit"	53	—	—	
1994	"Du bist Energie für mich"	56	—	—	Energie
1994	"Du weißt es, ich weiß es"	72	—	—	Energie
1998	"Hit-Mix"	80	—	—	Schatten
2004	"Geile Zeit"	93	—	—	Geile Zeit
2007	"Nichts ist wie du"	84	—	—	XVII
2009	"Sie liebt dich wie du bist"	47	—	—	Eigene Wege

Other German non-charting singles

Year	Album	Peak positions	Album
Year	Album	GER	Album
1982	"Zeig mir die Nacht"	—	Umsteiger
1982	"Baby Blue"	—	Umsteiger
1983	"Ich steh' auf Licht"	—	Licht
1983	"Rumpelstilzchen"	—	Licht
1984	"SOS"	—	Herzschlag einer Stadt
1985	"Herzschlag ist der Takt"	—	Herzschlag einer Stadt
1988	"Diana"	—	Fantasie
1990	"Ihr kommt zu spät"	—	Purpurmond
1994	"Schenk' mir eine Nacht"	—	Schenk' mir eine Nacht – ihre schönsten Lovesongs
1995	"Du bist da"	—	Energie
1996	"Komm doch zu mir"	—	Entführ Mich
1997	"Liebe, Lust und Leidenschaft"	—	Entführ Mich
1998	"Dann versinkt die Welt in Schweigen"	—	Schatten
1998	"Schuld war wieder die Nacht"	—	Schatten
2000	"Du bist nicht allein"	—	Freiheit die ich meine
2000	"Solang"	—	Freiheit die ich meine
2000	"Wachgeküsst"	—	Wachgeküsst
2000	"Wieder und wieder"	—	Wachgeküsst
2003	"Tausendmal du (Version 2003)"	—	Zeitmaschine
2005	"Ein Engel wie du"	—	Geile Zeit
2005	"Du bist das Leben"	—	
2010	"Seit der Nacht"	—	Ohne Limit
2013	"Meergefühl"	—	

=== English-language studio albums ===
- 1987: Romancing in the Dark
- 1988: Fantasy
- 1990: Love is No Science

=== English-language singles ===
Year	Album	Peak positions			
Year	Album	AUS	IRE	NE	UK
1988	"Keeping the Dream Alive"	55	20	18	14

Others

- "Every Time" (NO-5 SE-15)
- "Play It Cool" (NO-10 SE-17 NL-4)
- "Baby It's You"
- "Back to the Sunshine"
- "Kissed You in the Rain"
- "Diana"
- "All I Can Do"

== Notes ==
- Universal-music.de: Tim Wilhelm ist neuer Sänger der Münchener Freiheit, 1 March 2012.

Preceded by Wind with "Träume sind für alle da"	Germany in the Eurovision Song Contest; 1993	Succeeded by Mekado with "Wir geben 'ne Party"
