= Spalacopsis lobata =

Scientific classification
- Kingdom: Animalia
- Phylum: Arthropoda
- Class: Insecta
- Order: Coleoptera
- Suborder: Polyphaga
- Infraorder: Cucujiformia
- Family: Cerambycidae
- Genus: Spalacopsis
- Species: S. lobata

Binomial name
- Spalacopsis lobata Breuning, 1942

Species of beetle

Spalacopsis lobata is a species of beetle in the family Cerambycidae. It was first described by Breuning in 1942.
