= Akurat =

Polish band

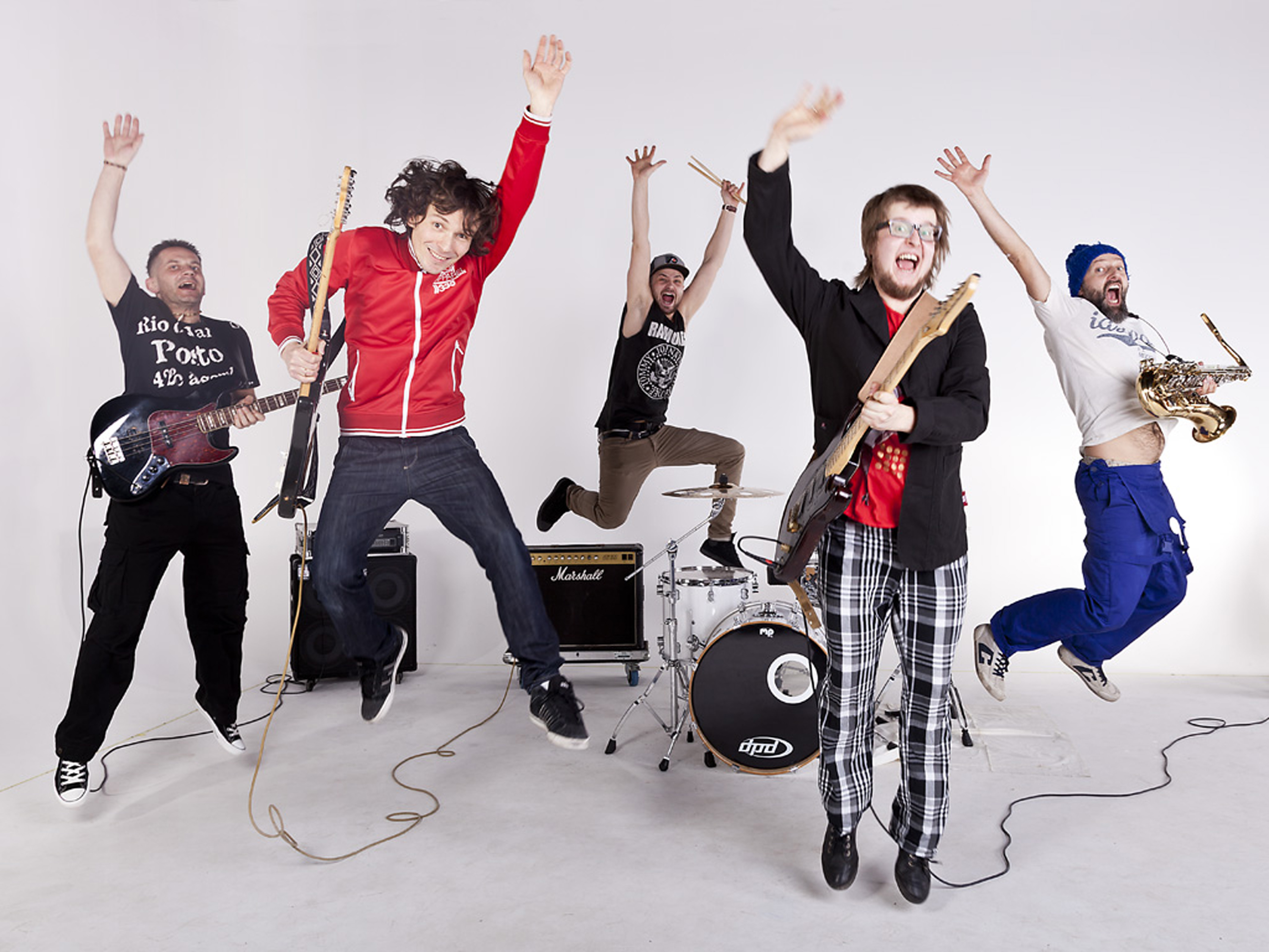
- Akurat 2013

Background information
- Origin: Bielsko-Biała, Poland
- Genres: Punk rock, reggae, ska, pop rock
- Years active: 1994–present
- Labels: Universal Music Poland, Metal Mind Productions, Mystic Production
- Members: Piotr Wróbel; Wojciech Żółty; Michał Sosna; Eugeniusz Kubat; Bartłomiej Pawlus
- Past members: Ireneusz Wojnar; Przemysław Zwias; Tomasz Kłaptocz "Yoyo"; Krzysztof Krupa; Marcin Stroński; Dariusz Wilk "Mróva"; Jarosław Bandzul; Piotr Fuchs
- Website: (in Polish) http://www.akurat.pl

Akurat is a Polish band formed in November 1994 in Bielsko-Biała. 'Akurat' is an ambiguous Polish word, standing for either 'exactly, just enough' or 'yeah, sure right'. The band's style fuses punk rock, reggae, ska and pop.

== Discography ==
=== Studio albums ===
Title	Album details
Pomarańcza	Released: 21 February 2001; Label: Universal Music Poland; Formats: CD
Prowincja	Released: 29 September 2003; Label: Agencja koncertowo-wydawnicza "Akurat"; Formats: CD
Fantasmagorie	Released: 31 May 2006; Label: Metal Mind Productions; Formats: CD
Optymistyka	Released: 10 November 2008; Label: Mystic Production; Formats: CD, digital download
Człowiek	Released: 1 June 2010; Label: Mystic Production; Formats: CD, digital download
Akurat Gra Kleyffa i Jedną Kelusa	Released: 6 November 2012; Label: Mystic Production; Formats: CD, digital download

=== Music videos ===
Title	Year	Directed	Album	Ref.
"Droga długa jest"	2001	—	Pomarańcza	
"Hahahaczyk"	2001	—	Pomarańcza	
"Lubię mówić z tobą"	2001	—	Pomarańcza	
"Do prostego człowieka"	2003	—	Prowincja	
"Wiej-ska"	2003	—	Prowincja	
"Fantasmagorie"	2006	—	Fantasmagorie	
"Tylko najwięksi"	2007	—	Fantasmagorie	
"Żółty Wróbel"	2008	—	Optymistyka	
"Język ciała"	2009	—	Optymistyka	
"Piewcy"	2009	—	Optymistyka	
"Godowy majowy"	2010	—	Człowiek	
"Ale człowiek song"	2010	—	Człowiek	
"Nie fikam"	2011	—	Człowiek	
"Przed Snem - Słoiczek Tiananmen"	2012	Olaf Malinowski	Akurat Gra Kleyffa i Jedną Kelusa	
"Miłość - źródło 2"	2013	Paweł Bogacz	Akurat Gra Kleyffa i Jedną Kelusa	
