= Pomarańcza =

Studio album by Akurat
- Released: January 29, 2001
- Genre: Punk rock, rock, reggae, ska, pop
- Length: 61:40
- Label: Scena FM

Akurat chronology
Pomarańcza (2001)	Prowincja (2003)

Pomarańcza (Polish for "orange fruit") is Akurat's first album released on January 29, 2001.

== Track listing ==
Titles in brackets are translated from Polish.

1. "Hahahaczyk"
2. "Espania (jem pomarańcze)" (Espania (I'm eating oranges))
3. "Droga długa jest" (The path is long)
4. "Spokój, wielki spokój" (Quiet, great quiet)
5. "Łyżeczka" (Spoon)
6. "Nie same dźwięki złe" (Not only bad sounds)
7. "Jak zioła" (Like herbs)
8. "Lubię mówić z tobą" (I like speaking with you)
9. "O dziewiątce" (About nine)
10. "Pomarańczowa mantra" (Orange mantra)
11. "KątemPlujący"
12. "Czas dogania nas" (Time catches us up)
13. "Okciuk"
14. "Dzwon ciszy" (Bell of silence)
15. "Nuta o ptakach" (Tune about birds)
16. "Pa pa pa..." (Bye bye...)

== Singles ==
- "Droga długa jest"
- "Hahahaczyk"
- "Lubię mówić z tobą"

== Notes ==
1. Title is a neologism constructed with words "hahaha", which indicates laughing, and "haczyk", which means a small hook. According to the lyrics and video clip, song pasquinades dres subculture (hook symbolise Nike logo).
2. Another neologism composed with words "kątem" (by a corner) and "plujący" (spiting). It is also a homophone: "kontemplujący" means somebody who contemplates and "kątem plujący", in literally translation, means spiting by a corner.
3. While "kciuk" means thumb, the title can be translated as "against-a-thumb": the lyrics speak about "rubbing the left thumb against the right thumb".
