= Spalacopsis protensa =

Scientific classification
- Domain: Eukaryota
- Kingdom: Animalia
- Phylum: Arthropoda
- Class: Insecta
- Order: Coleoptera
- Suborder: Polyphaga
- Infraorder: Cucujiformia
- Family: Cerambycidae
- Genus: Spalacopsis
- Species: S. protensa

Binomial name
- Spalacopsis protensa (Pascoe, 1871)

Species of beetle

Spalacopsis protensa is a species of beetle in the family Cerambycidae. It was first described by Pascoe in 1871.
