= Purpurmond =

Studio album by Münchener Freiheit
- Released: 27 November 1989
- Recorded: 1989
- Genre: Pop
- Length: 43:37
- Label: CBS
- Producer: Armand Volker

Münchener Freiheit chronology
Fantasy (1988)	Purpurmond (1989)	Love is No Science (1990)

Purpurmond (in English, Purple Moon) was the 6th studio album by Münchener Freiheit in their native language, reaching #17 in the German charts. Three minor hit singles were released from the album, the most successful being the lead-off single Verlieben verlieren. The album's promotional tour was later chronicled on the double CD/video Freiheit Live (1990).

Most tracks from the album were re-recorded in English and released in 1990 as the album Love is No Science.

== Track listing ==
- Verlieben verlieren 4:10
- Die unsichtbare welt 4:00
- Stell dir vor 3:14
- In der Mitte dieser Nacht 3:54
- Ihr kommt zu spät 4:21
- Laß mich nie mehr los 3:34
- Wo du bist 3:56
- Ich will dich nochmal 4:12
- Purpurmond 3:56
- Wenn ein Stern vom Himmel fällt 4:49
- Was ich fand 3:31
- Verlieben verlieren (rhythm remix) 4:16 (CD versions only)

All music and lyrics by Stefan Zauner and Aron Strobel

== Personnel ==
- Stefan Zauner - Vocals
- Aron Strobel - Guitars
- Michael Kunzi - Bass
- Alex Grünwald - Keyboards
- Rennie Hatzke - Drums

Produced by Armand Volker
