= Spalacopsis filum =

Scientific classification
- Domain: Eukaryota
- Kingdom: Animalia
- Phylum: Arthropoda
- Class: Insecta
- Order: Coleoptera
- Suborder: Polyphaga
- Infraorder: Cucujiformia
- Family: Cerambycidae
- Genus: Spalacopsis
- Species: S. filum

Binomial name
- Spalacopsis filum (Klug, 1829)

Species of beetle

Spalacopsis filum is a species of beetle in the family Cerambycidae. It was first described by Johann Christoph Friedrich Klug in 1829.
