= Phantasmagoria (disambiguation) =

Phantasmagoria is a form of horror theater using an optical device to display moving images.

Phantasmagoria may also refer to:

== Music ==
- Phantasmagoria (band), a Japanese rock band
- Phantasmagoria (Curved Air album) or the title song, 1972
- Phantasmagoria (The Damned album), 1985
- Phantasmagoria (Limbonic Art album) or the title song, 2010
- Phantasmagoria, an album by Nobuo Uematsu, 1994
- "Phantasmagoria", a song by Annihilator from Never, Neverland, 1990
- "Phantasmagoria", a song by Melt-Banana from Cell-Scape, 2003
- "Phantasmagoria", a song by Days N' Daze from The Oogle Deathmachine, 2013

== Other uses ==
- Phantasmagoria, a horror, fantasy and science fiction magazine based in Belfast
- Phantasmagoria (audio drama), a 1999 audio drama based on Doctor Who
- "Phantasmagoria" (poem), an 1869 poem by Lewis Carroll
- Phantasmagoria (video game), a 1995 point-and-click adventure horror game
- Phantasmagoria: The Visions of Lewis Carroll, an unfinished film project by Marilyn Manson
- Phantasmagoria a 1825 anthology of poetry and prose by Maria Jane Jewsbury
- ORFN or Phantasmagoria, Aaron Curry (1974–2016), American graffiti artist
- PHANTASMAGORIA, a Japanese multimedia franchise related to the 1995 video anthology A Piece of Phantasmagoria

== See also ==
- Fantasmagoria, an Argentine band
- Fantasmagoriana, an 1812 French anthology of German ghost stories
- Phantasm (disambiguation)
- Fantasmagorie (disambiguation)
