= Spalacopsis ornatipennis =

Scientific classification
- Domain: Eukaryota
- Kingdom: Animalia
- Phylum: Arthropoda
- Class: Insecta
- Order: Coleoptera
- Suborder: Polyphaga
- Infraorder: Cucujiformia
- Family: Cerambycidae
- Genus: Spalacopsis
- Species: S. ornatipennis

Binomial name
- Spalacopsis ornatipennis Fisher, 1935

Species of beetle

Spalacopsis ornatipennis is a species of beetle in the family Cerambycidae. It was first described by Fisher in 1935.
