= Fantazia =

Fantazia could refer to:

- Fantazia, a dance music organisation based in the United Kingdom
- Fantazia (novel series), a series of books by Egyptian writer Ahmed Khaled Towfik
- Fantázia, a Slovak science fiction, fantasy, and horror magazine

== See also ==
- Fantasia (disambiguation)
- Fantazaki
