= Hi-Fi Un!corn =

Japanese boy band

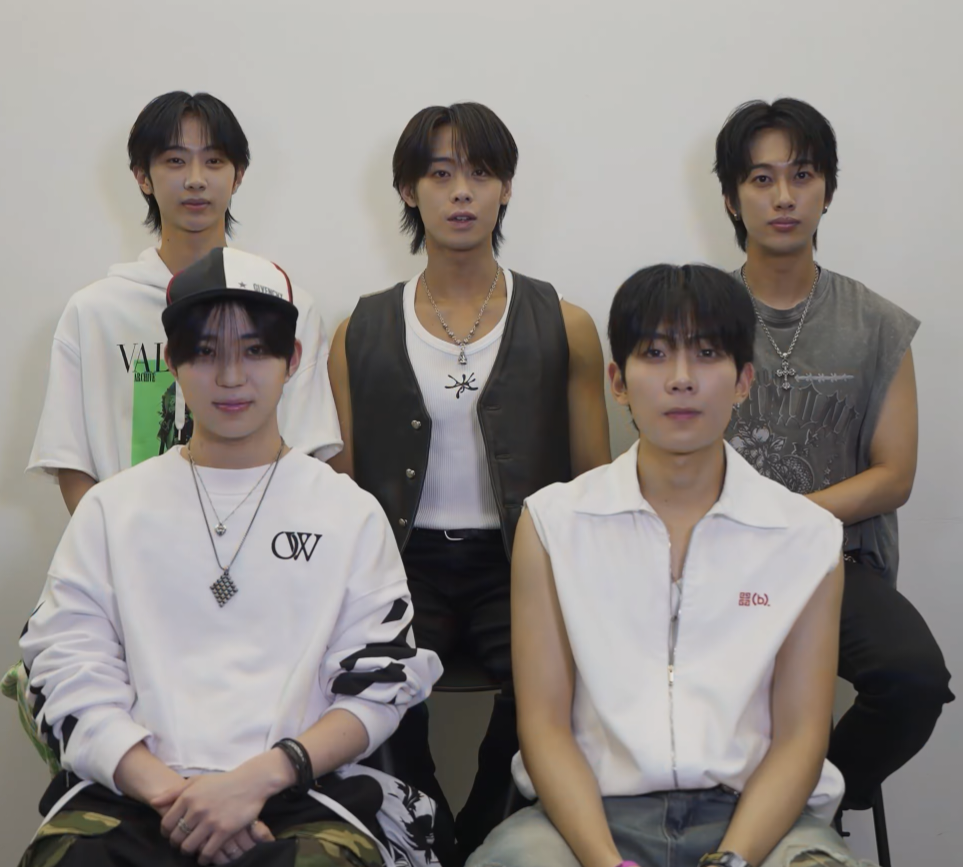
- Hi-Fi Un!corn in 2026

Background information
- Genres: J-pop; rock
- Years active: 2023–present
- Label: FNC Japan
- Members: Kim Hyun-yul; Son Ki-yoon; Um Tae-min; Shuto Fukushima; Heo Min
- Website: www.hifiunicorn.com

Hi-Fi Un!corn (Japanese: ハイファイユニコーン, Hepburn: Haifai Yunikōn; Korean: 하이파이유니콘; RR: Haipaiyunikon) is a five-member boy band active in Japan and South Korea. The group was formed through the survival show The Idol Band: Boy's Battle and debuted with the digital single, "Over the Rainbow" in June 2023.

== Members ==
- Kim Hyun-yul (김현율) – leader, guitar
- Son Ki-yoon (손기윤) – bass
- Um Tae-min (엄태민) – vocals, guitar
- Shuto Fukushima (福嶌 崇人) – vocals
- Heo Min (허민) – drums

== Discography ==
=== Studio albums ===
Title	Album details	Peak chart positions	
Title	Album details	JPN	JPN Hot
Fantasia	Released: August 28, 2024; Label: FNC Entertainment; Formats: CD, digital download	10	10
First Move	Released: March 25, 2026; Label: Sony Music Japan; Formats: CD, digital download	6	—

=== Singles ===
Title	Year	Peak chart positions		Album
Title	Year	JPN	JPN Hot	Album
"Over the Rainbow"	2023	—	—	Fantasia
"U&I"	2023	28	—	Fantasia
"ABC Is"	2024	—	—	Fantasia
"Phantom Pain"	2024	—	—	Fantasia
"Left or Right"	2024	—	—	Fantasia
"Beat It Beat It"	2025	3	—	First Move
"Teenage Blue"	2025	8	—	First Move
"Super Duper"	2026	—	—	First Move
"Hungry Heart"	2026	—	—	First Move
"Telescope"	2026	—	72	Non-album single
"—" denotes releases that did not chart or were not released in that region.
