= Eilema phantasma =

Scientific classification
- Kingdom: Animalia
- Phylum: Arthropoda
- Class: Insecta
- Order: Lepidoptera
- Superfamily: Noctuoidea
- Family: Erebidae
- Subfamily: Arctiinae
- Genus: Eilema
- Species: E. phantasma

Binomial name
- Eilema phantasma Toulgoët, 1955

Species of moth

Eilema phantasma is a moth of the subfamily Arctiinae. It was described by Hervé de Toulgoët in 1955. It is found on Madagascar.
