= Spalacopsis phantasma =

Scientific classification
- Domain: Eukaryota
- Kingdom: Animalia
- Phylum: Arthropoda
- Class: Insecta
- Order: Coleoptera
- Suborder: Polyphaga
- Infraorder: Cucujiformia
- Family: Cerambycidae
- Genus: Spalacopsis
- Species: S. phantasma

Binomial name
- Spalacopsis phantasma Bates, 1885

Species of beetle

Spalacopsis phantasma is a species of beetle in the family Cerambycidae. It was first described by Bates in 1885.
