= I.N.V.U. (manhwa) =

South Korean manhwa series

- Cover of the Tokyopop edition of I.N.V.U. vol. 1 (2003), art by Kim Kang-won
- Genre: Contemporary romance, Soap opera, Drama
- Author: Kim Kang-won
- Publisher: (South Korea) Haksan Publishing
- English publisher: (Australia) (New Zealand) Madman Entertainment (Canada) (United States) Tokyopop
- Other publishers: (Germany) Tokyopop (France) Saphira (Denmark) (Norway) (Sweden) Mangismo (2008) (Italy) Flashbook
- Magazine: Monthly Party
- Original run: 2000 – Present
- Collected volumes: 6

I.N.V.U. (pronounced as "I envy you"/an acronym standing for "Innocent, Nice, Vivid, Unique") is a manhwa series by Kim Kang-won, that tells the story of Sey Hong, the beautiful daughter of a novelist who has left her with a family of complete strangers named the Kangs, to go research her next novel in Italy. Sey often finds herself caught up in the slightly surreal schemes and romantic entanglements of her friends, acquaintances and potential suitor Siho Lee. There are a handful of odd secrets being kept from her by her new "normal" family, as well.

== Plot ==
Sixteen-year-old Sey wakes up to the sounds of people in her bedroom. Moving men are packing up her things and her mother tells her, "I'm going to Italy for five years," and leaves her in the care of her friend from college, Meja Kang. They are complete strangers to Sey and have a son named Terry her age. It turns out the family has some issues of its own since Terry is actually their daughter Hali, who is pretending to be her dead brother to prevent her mother from having a mental break-down.

Deciding that she wants to be self-sufficient, Sey looks for a job and finds one at a gas-station. However, in order to work there she is forced to learn how to skate. Siho Lee, a classmate who happens to be dating her friend Ria Yoo and is the one who got her the job, offers to teach her. It is later revealed that Siho owns the gas-station when Sey gets in trouble with a customer and Siho has to pay for the damages. Not wanting to be in debt to him, Sey begins tutoring him after school for mid-terms. Sey is uncomfortable being around Siho because he is a boy. Due to her mother's many lovers and the tell-all autobiography her mother published when Sey was in middle school, her male peers thought "like mother like daughter". Sey has never dated and is known as an ice queen who hates men. The fact that Siho lives alone is not a bonus to the situation. Siho later reveals to Sey that he and Ria broke up because he likes someone else. A conversation between Ria and Sey reveals that it was Sey he was talking about.

Despite everything, she and Siho end up culminating a strange friendship. While giving him notes one day, she experiences her first kiss, but that is interrupted by a door slamming her head. She refuses to acknowledge the kiss because it was "stolen" from her and because it happened with Siho, who is known for his "wandering hands". At the end of book three, Siho manages to win a date with Sey based on a bet on how high his score would be on his midterm. The date turns out to be a disaster since they were being stalked by Siho's ex and Sey got Siho's birthday cake in her face. After trying to escape from Siho, he manages to catch up with her and kiss her. Despite seeming to enjoy the kiss, she hits him and runs away but forgets her cellphone. At school, as she tries to get it back from him, they accidentally set on the speakers and are forced to hide from the principal. A stressed out Sey tells Siho to leave her alone and that he always makes her do things she doesn't want to do. An angry and hurt Siho apologizes for butting into her life and that he will leave her alone.

After school, Sey turns up at Sihos apartment to get her phone. Hurt from Sihos cold attitude towards her, she tells him that he has no consideration to other peoples feelings and rushes of to the elevator. Siho sneaks up behind her and asks her if she is afraid of him. Sey confesses that she is afraid of the situation since it was all new to her and that Siho did not make it better by doing what he wanted. Placing his chin on the top of her head, Siho apologizes to which Sey tells him he is heavy.

In volume 5, Siho and Sey have yet another argument, where Siho finds out that he isn't as far up on Sey's priority list as he thought. When Sey is at the hospital to give Mrs. Kang some change, she runs into him and his mother. It is revealed that Siho's mother suffers from brain damage, caused by a car accident. She and Siho had been hiding in the US from his father at the time and Siho suspects that his father was behind the accident. In return for going with his father back to Korea, his mother receives medical care. Realizing that she and Siho are both very similar, she takes his hands as she tells him so. How their relationship develops is to be seen in volume 6.

== Characters ==
=== The girls ===
Sey Hong - (16) Sey is a shy, boy hating 16-year-old at the beginning of the series. Her best friends are Jae and Ria. Sey has a strange relationship with her mother. All her life Sey's mother has done things like move to France, write a tell-all book of her love life, give Sey wine for an upset stomach—things no normal parent would do. Siho serves as her primary love interest, but in the past she has had a crush on Jun Cho, her homeroom teacher, and childhood friend. She and Siho grow very close and they appear to be a couple even though neither of them has officially said it.

Ria Yoo - (16) Is one of Sey's friends but she doesn't go to the same school as Sey and Jae. A very flirtatious girl but also fickle. She is a very driven young lady who wants to become a model and will do almost anything to reach her goal. She dates Siho first because she knows of his family connections. When Siho asks her many questions about Sey then breaks up with her, she bargains with him—an introduction to some of those connections for her to leave the 'couple' alone. In vol. 4 she goes to an audition with a boy named Jun Cho, a friend Sey sent to watch her. However an argument between him, Rian and the director, leads to Jun spilling noodle soup on her expensive clothes that she had borrowed from her father's work. In vol. 5, she gets a job with a fashion designer to repay her father for destroying the clothes.

Hali Kang - (16) She has a very unusual life. She is pretending to be her brother as her mother and brother were in a car accident. Her younger brother Terry died and her mother gets amnesia, thinking Hali is her son. In the process, Meja (her mother) forgets she had a daughter. Hali's father wants her to pretend to be Terry, hoping his wife will soon get over this delusion. She is in love with Hajun Cho whom she met and fell in love with when he was her tutor in 8th or 9th grade. He was in college and not interested (so he said). She now is his student in high school, and is still in love with him, and she doesn't take no for an answer. In volume 5 it is shown that her mother suffers from episodes where she realises that Hali is a girl and not her brother which results in her becoming abusive of Hali. When Hajun finds out about her life they grow close, so much that they become a secret couple. But as Hajun's family announces his engagement to another woman, Hali's happiness is short lived.

Jae Eun Kim - (16) She goes to the same school as Sey and is her best friend. She is a supporter of a Sey-Siho relationship and tries to encourage Sey to see Siho. Sey confides in her quite a lot. She makes cosplay costumes and dreams of becoming a manga artist. Jae has a crush on Simon and has put him in her manga, casting him as the main character of some pretty interesting scenarios. Those scenarios are later seen by Simon, which leads to her running away from him, believing that her chances with him are gone. They make up in vol. 5, when Simon praises her for following her heart. But it remains questionable if they will get together, since he hints to her that he is gay.

=== The boys ===
Siho Lee - (17) Siho lives a very complicated life: he lives alone, supports himself, his brother is a violent thug who beats him up and wrecks his gas station (Siho's only source of income), his father is the head of a large crime syndicate and at school most people are afraid of him (including the teachers) because of his reputation as a 'bad boy'. He meets Sey and her friends at the mall (by accidentally hitting her in the head with his backpack) and although he agrees to go out with her friend Ria, he seems extremely interested in Sey—watching her in class, listening to people talk about her, and asking Ria about her. One way or another, he finds ways to spend time with Sey. Ria describes him as having wandering hands, and his employees say that his previous girlfriend had gotten pregnant. Despite having a bad reputation, he is very restrained with Sey, only kissing her a few times, much to her dismay (as she's never dated before). Vol. 4 shows the most progress in their relationship, as they seem to be on the verge of dating but not officially 'dating'. His mother suffers from brain damage from a car accident that he suspects his father caused. In exchange for him moving in with his father, his mother receives medical care. He confesses this to Sey after she meets him and his mother at the hospital. This revelation brings them closer together.

Hajun Cho - (25) A teacher in Sey's school. All of the girls in the school are crazy about him, including Sey. He lived next door to Sey and Hali when they were growing up so they are childhood friends. He was adopted by his grandfather's friend, is the heir of a large educational corporation and is rich. When Hali comes back into his life and tries to romantically pursue him, he has to fight his attraction toward her. He starts dating a woman that his family has chosen for him, but can't rid himself of his feelings for Hali. They become a secret couple in volume 5, but he faces problems when pictures of him and Hali surface the Internet. As a result, his family arranges a marriage and has the engagement announced in the media, something that does not go over well with Hali.

Simon Moon - (18) A senior who goes to the same high school as Ria Yoo. An aspiring pastry chef, he teaches a cooking class (that's mostly frequented by middle-aged housewives) at a community center. He comes from a family of bakers who work in the hotel owned by Siho's father. He seems to like Jae Eun but hasn't asked her out yet.

Yungjun Cho - (16) Sey's childhood friend, they're the same age and have been in the same class every year. He lives with his older brother Hajun while going to school.

== Production details ==
INVU is published by Haksan and drawn and written by Kang Won Kim. Four volumes have been published so far in Korea, but there was a long break between the third and fourth volumes while the creator Kang Won Kim worked on her other series, The Queen's Knight. Volume 4 was released in Korea in May 2006 and was released in Germany by Tokyopop in June 2007 and in the U.S. by Tokyopop in September 2007.
