= Fantasie (Münchener Freiheit album) =

Studio album by Münchener Freiheit
- Released: 1988
- Recorded: 1988
- Genre: Pop
- Length: 39:21
- Label: CBS
- Producer: Armand Volker

Münchener Freiheit chronology
| Romancing in the Dark (1987) | Fantasie (1988) | Fantasy (1988) |

Fantasie is the fifth proper studio album by Münchener Freiheit and their highest charting, reaching number four in the German charts. The album spawned three hit singles, including the number two hit, Solang' man Träume noch leben kann. Fantasie was completely re-recorded with English lyrics and later released throughout Europe and the US as Fantasy.

The album contains an alternative version of "Solang' man Träume noch leben kann", performed entirely by the band without the orchestra and choir.

== Track listing ==
All music by Stefan Zauner and Aron Strobel except "So heiß" (Stefan Zauner and Michael Kunzi). All lyrics by Stefan Zauner and Aron Strobel

1. "Bis wir uns wiederseh'n" – 3:45
2. "In Deinen Augen" – 4:41
3. "Diana" – 4:17
4. "Land der Fantasie" – 4:53
5. "Mondlicht" – 3:05
6. "So heiß" – 4:04
7. "Zum allerersten Mal" – 3:22
8. "Du bist dabei" – 3:45
9. "Laß es einfach gescheh'n" – 4:08
10. "Solang' man Träume noch leben kann" (version 2) – 3:25

== Personnel ==
- Stefan Zauner – vocals
- Aron Strobel – guitars
- Michael Kunzi – bass
- Alex Grünwald – keyboards
- Rennie Hatzke – drums
- Produced by Armand Volker

== Charts ==
| Chart (1988) | Peak position |
|---|---|
| German Albums (Offizielle Top 100) | 4 |
