= Fantasia (Hi-Fi Un!corn album) =

- Digital cover

Studio album by Hi-Fi Un!corn
- Released: August 28, 2024
- Genre: J-pop
- Length: 40:54
- Language: Japanese
- Label: FNC

Hi-Fi Un!corn chronology
Over the Rainbow (2023)	Fantasia (2024)

Singles from Hi-Fi Un!corn
- 1. "U&I" Released: August 28, 2024

Fantasia is the debut studio album by Japanese boy band Hi-Fi Un!corn. It was released on August 28, 2024, by FNC Entertainment. The album contains ten tracks, including the lead single "U&I".

== Background ==
The band’s debut single “Over the Rainbow” was produced by the famous Korean boy band CN Blue’s leader and vocalist Jung Yong-hwa.

We hope to comfort listeners with our music in diverse languages. We are really nervous and excited about this debut, but we can confidently say that we are ready to face the public.

— Taemin talks about the album.

== Commercial performance ==
The album peaked at number 10 on the Oricon Albums Chart and number 10 on the Billboard Japan albums chart.

== Track listing ==
Fantasia track listing
No.	Title	Length
1.	"U&I"	4:21
2.	"Butterfly"	3:38
3.	"Left or Right"	4:19
4.	"Running Away"	3:37
5.	"Phantom Pain"	5:15
6.	"ABC Is"	4:38
7.	"Stay with You"	3:55
8.	"Over the Rainbow" (Japanese version)	3:59
9.	"Days"	3:36
10.	"DoReMiFa-Soul" (Japanese version)	3:36
Total length:		40:54

== Charts ==
Weekly chart performance for Fantasia
Chart (2024)	Peak position
Japanese Albums (Oricon)	10
Japanese Hot Albums (Billboard Japan)	10
