= Fantasmagorie (album) =

Studio album by Akurat
- Released: May 31, 2006
- Genre: Ska
- Length: 45:43
- Label: Metal Mind Productions

Akurat chronology
Prowincja (2003)	Fantasmagorie (2006)

Fantasmagorie is an album by Akurat, released on May 31, 2006.

== Track listing ==
1. "Tylko najwięksi"
2. "Fantasmagorie"
3. "Słowa mają mnie"
4. "Kiedy wrócę tu"
5. "Demo"
6. "Sama śmietanka"
7. "Szerzej"
8. "Garb"
9. "Kiedy bliżej z tobą będę"
10. "Jeden człowiek to jeden sens"
11. "Pracuję"
12. "Łan"
13. "Czy to już"

== Singles ==
- "Fantasmagorie"

== Credits ==
- Łukasz Gocal – drums
- Ireneusz Wojnar – bass
- Tomasz Kłaptocz – vocals, trumpet
- Piotr Wróbel – guitar, vocals
- Wojciech Żółty – guitar, vocals
- Przemysław Zwias – saxophone, flute
