= Fantasio (magician) =

Argentine magician

- Born: Ricardo Roucau; October 3, 1936; Buenos Aires, Argentina
- Died: October 30, 2017 (aged 81)

Ricardo Roucau (3 October 1936 – 30 October 2017) was a magician commonly known as Fantasio.

Roucau became interested in magic at an early age after seeing Fu Manchu perform in Argentina.

Roucau previously performed as Ricardo and then as Larry, before being warned in 1961 by John Scarne that the name would not work for a magician trying to make it in America. He also performed with his wife as 'Larry and Daisy'. Roucau adopted the name Fantasio after noticing it on a box of playing cards.

Roucau was known for his handling of walking sticks and lit candles, which he would make materialise during his act. Roucau was a prolific inventor, and Mike Caveney believes that Fantasio's appearing and disappearing props were at one point the most popular magic props in the world.

Roucau performed at the Desert Inn in Las Vegas, and the Latin Quarter and Radio City Music Hall in New York City. He also appeared on The Hollywood Palace and The Ed Sullivan Show.

Roucau and his wife Monica won second place in General Magic at the 1979 Fédération Internationale des Sociétés Magiques (FISM) competition and Rocau won second place in Comedy Magic in the 1994 FISM competition.

Fantasio was a lifetime member of Ring 45 and Assembly 280. In 2010, he was named Dean of Assembly 280.

== Published books ==
- Magic with Canes and Candles (1970)
- My Canes and Candles (1990)
