= The Queen's Knight =

South Korean graphic novel

- Cover, The Queen's Knight volume 1 (Tokyopop edition)

^여왕의 기사
- Genre: Romantic fantasy, Drama, Tragedy
- Author: Kim Kang-won
- Publisher: (South Korea) Haksan Publishing
- English publisher: (Australia) (New Zealand) Madman Entertainment (Canada) (United States) Tokyopop
- Other publishers: (Germany) Tokyopop (France) Saphira
- Original run: 1997
- Volumes: 17

The Queen's Knight, is a South Korean manhwa graphic novel, written and illustrated by Kim Kang-won, creator of the high-school soap opera, I.N.V.U. It is distributed in English by Tokyopop.

== Plot ==
When Yuna Lee's mother moves to Germany to pursue a music degree, Yuna is left to stay with her father, a university professor, and her three older brothers, who are overprotective of her. During her summer vacation, she visits her mother in Germany, where she falls off a cliff and is rescued by Rieno, an 18-year-old knight living in the land of Phantasma. Rieno makes a deal with Yuna that, because he has saved her life, she must become his queen. Indebted to him for saving her life, Yuna is torn between her normal world back home and life as Phantasma's Queen.

== Characters ==
=== Normal world ===
Yuna Lee

Main character, age 15. She is the youngest child of the Lee family and the only girl. Currently in 8th grade. Yuna has three older brothers who are highly over protective of her. Her father is a professor at a university, and her mother is in Germany, pursuing her degree in Music, which was on hold due to her marriage and the birth and raising of her children. She has a crush on her childhood friend, Kahyun Song, who happens to be her third brother's friend.

She travelled to visit her mother in Germany, during summer vacation, and broke her leg, falling into the gorge at the Neuschwanstein Castle in South Bavaria. She is saved by the mysterious knight Rieno, who makes her Queen of Phantasma. When Spring arrives, she is sent to the queen's castle in Elysian and is introduced to her three Guardian knights. She also meets her main antagonists: Princess Libera and Chancellor Kent.

Although Spring is said to have been brought about by the Queen's love for Rieno, Yuna claims that she will never love or forgive him. And true to her word, it seems that she has turned her interest to one of her Guardian Knights, Ehren. Yuna love for Rieno still remains but because of Ehren's presence she became marvelously better.
Yuna has many differences from the past Queens of Phantasma.

1. She is not strikingly beautiful like most would expect her to be. In fact, unless informed otherwise, most people believe her to be just some young girl (or boy, depending on her clothes and hairstyle). She often dresses in male phantasma clothes, and once asked the maid to make some modern clothes (i.e. a sundress, hoodie, T-shirt, etc.)
2. She is more interested in helping her kingdom and participating in politics, rather than indulging herself in jewellery and fancy dresses.
3. She seems to be the only Queen who has ever stood in opposition of Chancellor Kent.
4. She wants to know Phantasma and see its condition and its people for herself personally, and would like to make political, economical and educational reforms for her subjects. She does this by escaping the palace with her Guardian Knights (minus an injured Ehren) in the middle of the night disguised as traveling friends. She also commissions to build schools and hospitals in order to improve the living conditions of her subjects.
5. Her political and romantic situations seem to mirror those of Queen Elizabeth I of the Great Britain in the history of the real world.

Yuna also goes so far as to journey with both her Guardian knights and all of the other knights of Phantasma (including the infamous Rieno) into the Forest of Darkness, claiming that wherever her knights go, she will go personally, too.

Jin Lee

Eldest child of the Lee family and Yuna's eldest brother. Currently in his second year of college, majoring in computer. Known for being responsible and a space case. He also takes on the role of the 'mother' in the family.

Hyun Lee

Second child of the Lee family and Yuna's brother number 2. He is a senior in high school, and known for being a flirt and for being self-absorbed. Currently working part-time jobs to buy a movie camera.

Beum Lee

Third child of the Lee family, and Yuna's brother number 3. 16 years old. He is at the top of his class, in terms of academics and sports. Beum makes sure that no guy is allowed near his sister, with the reluctant exception of Kayhun. All other guys who showed the slightest interest in Yuna were quickly dissuaded. He makes sure that no one picks on Yuna at school, and is very protective of her. In Yuna's opinion, he is more caring and loving to animals than to any human being.

Kahyun Song

Yuna's childhood friend and friends with Beum. 16 years old. A piano prodigy. Yuna's mother used to give him lessons when he was young. Due to a car crash, his hands were severely damaged and he has been on leave from school for a year. It is said that he will never be able to play piano like he used to. His father is the local doctor and owns the hospital. He seems to care for Yuna, but there is tension between them due to Mari Park.

Hae Won Min

Yuna's best friends since kindergarten. Has a crush on Beum Lee. She is quiet, calm, and a loyal and kind-hearted person.

Mari Park

A very sociable character. Transferred to Yuna's school during the end of 7th grade and after only two months, became the class representative. Envious of Yuna, her family, and her friends. Declares her love for Kahyun to Yuna and actively pursues Kahyun. She spreads rumors about Yuna claiming that she cheated to achieve such a drastic improvement in her exam scores.

=== Phantasma ===
Rieno

18 years old (or at least, that's when he stopped aging). A knight in the land of Phantasma. He rescues Yuna after she fell off a cliff in Germany. He promises to save Yuna's life, if she promises to become his queen and follow him into Phantasma. Yuna faints after seeing Rieno slit his wrist to make a blood binding contract. Rieno takes Yuna near humans so she can get her leg healed, but somehow Yuna returns to home country. Rieno begins invading Yuna's dreams to bring her back to Germany. He kidnaps Yuna on horseback on her return to Germany to see her mother, then hands her over to Hermeny to be properly installed in the Queen's Castle, once Spring arrives. Although he is a cold, heartless, and sometimes manipulative character, he shows what could be considered jealous behavior in the presence of the Guardian Knights, mainly Ehren. He is the heir to the throne of Darkness, and will become this feared position when he reaches the age of 19. His mother, Hexe, loved him very much, and used her black magic to make him invincible to wounds, potions, and spells.

Ehren Furst

Around 16 years old. Ehren is the son of the former Chancellor Ehren Furst and is the nephew of Chancellor Kent, as well as the Lord of Toeu. He was the first knight to meet Yuna, and not knowing her to be the Queen mistakes her for a hopeful knight. He calls her an idiot, and informs her that she is trespassing on the Hwerusute family's lands. After discovering her true identity, he helps with her studies of the law and the language of Phantasma. He has little faith in her due to her childish and naïve demeanor, and at first thought she was babyish because she would burst into tears and was reluctant to give orders. After Yuna accepts her role as the Queen and falls into the role of the mature, forceful monarch, Ehren shows a softer side and, on more than one occasion, lets Yuna cry on his shoulder and offers her comfort, much to the irritation of the other Knights, Rieno, Leon, and Schiller. However, he forces himself to change faces and hardens his heart once Yuna starts to experience growth on account of Rieno. Ehren loves Yuna and promise to become the best knight for her. He shows Yuna how her cursed love for Rieno will destroy Phantasma and forces her to choose between Rieno and Phantasma. She lets him choose for her, and so to protect his nation and his queen he announces at a banquet that Yuna's growth is due to him and to Yuna's surprise and horror, makes a wedding announcement: His and Yuna's.

Leon Per

Age unclear. Youngest of 6 brothers, from the hamlet of Hoch, Phantasma's best arms-producing hamlet, where they have a high regard for brute strength. A skilled fighter, Leon is brash and quick to anger, particularly on behalf of Yuna. Initially mistakes Schiller for a woman as well as getting on the bad side of Princess Libera, both for shooting one of her birds and for being rude and menacing to her while defending Yuna. At the Couple Festival in Hoch, he tells Yuna that he loves her and kisses her after she helps get him to a healing spring. She is only interested in being friends, but he promises to protect her anyway. Leon has been prophesied to be consort to the Queen of Phantasma, but when Grandmother Rehethee tries to glimpse his future wife she sees.... Libera! He and Libera have a very interesting love-hate relationship, they claim to hate each other but Liberia does think Leon is funny.

Schiller Licht

Age unclear. A very beautiful man, initially mistaken by Leon as a woman, and cross dresses with great success, when traveling in disguise. Hemel, the maker of the sleeping pill that allows the citizens of Phantasma to sleep through the long winters between queens, is Schiller's grandfather; Schiller is a skillful healer, himself. Schiller is expected to be able to woo Yuna skillfully, but has held back from doing so, so far. Rieno gets Schiller to reveal that he is the descendant of the bloodline of Light (Rieno himself has extremely Dark blood), which is connected to the people of Light, who appear as glowing spirits and are very beautiful and elfin in appearance. Yuna trusts him the most out of all her guardian knights because he reminds her of her brothers. Schiller has feeling for Yuna even willing to give up his life. He eventually gives up though his feelings currently remains but cares deeply for Yuna's well-being.
