= Chryst =

Austrian metal band

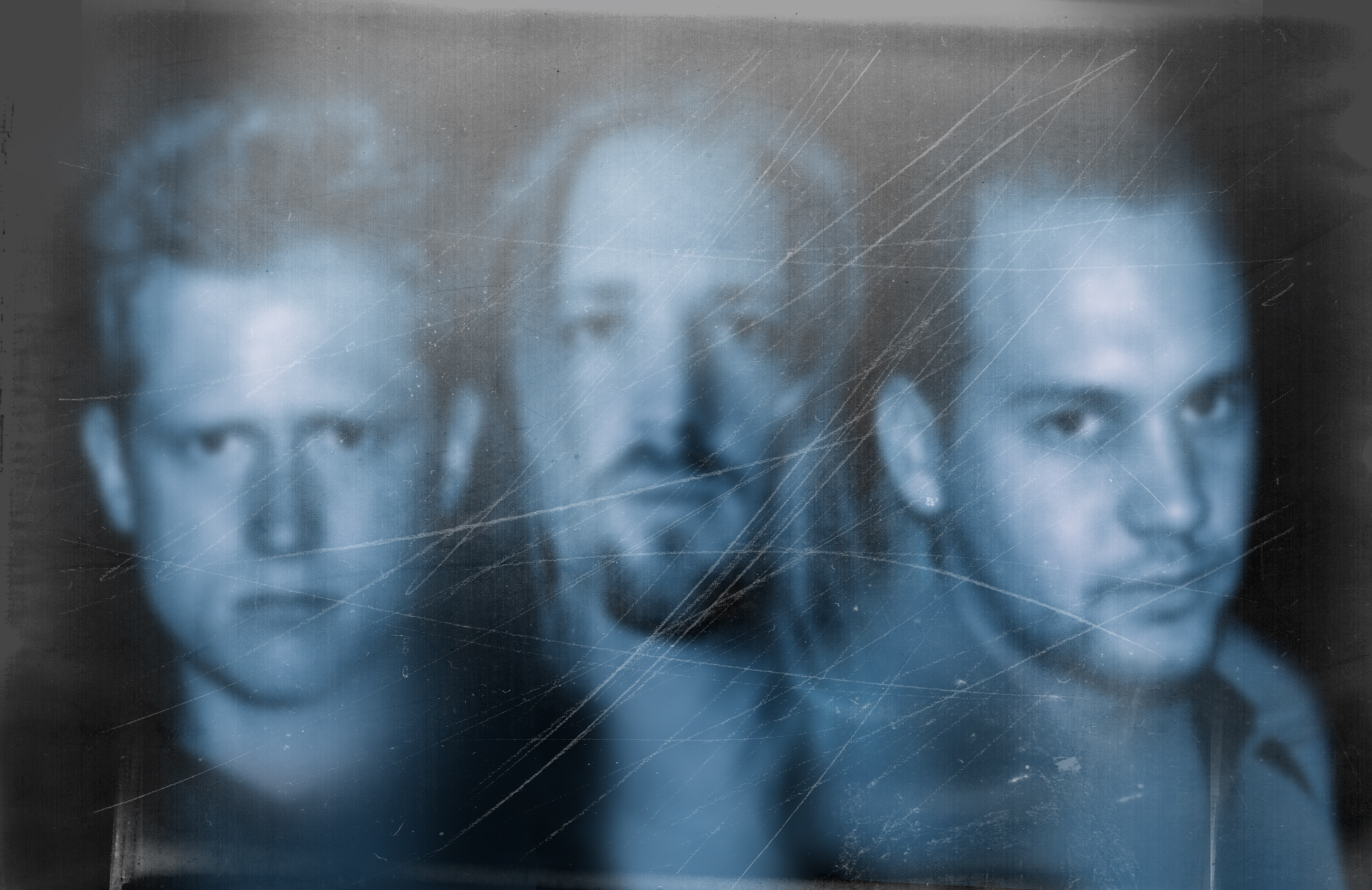
- A band picture of Chryst (then called Korovakill) in 2001. From left to right: Renaud Tschirner, Christof Niederwieser and Moritz Neuner

Background information
- Also known as: Korova (1990–2000); Korovakill (2000–2011)
- Origin: Innsbruck, Austria
- Genres: Avant-garde metal, extreme metal, black metal
- Years active: 1990–present
- Labels: Napalm Records, Red Stream, Omniversal Records
- Members: Christof Niederwieser
- Past members: Michael Kröll; Georg Razesberger; Florian Oberlechner; Herwing Huber; Susanne Eckbauer; Martina Astner

Chryst is an Austrian avant-garde/extreme metal one-man band formed in 1990 as Korova, then renamed to Korovakill, and finally to Chryst.

Their former name, Russian for "cow" (Корова), alludes to the "Korova Milk Bar" from Anthony Burgess's A Clockwork Orange.

== History ==
The future Chryst was formed in 1990 in Innsbruck, Austria, as Korova, by Christof Niederwieser (who would later provide vocals on Angizia's first two studio albums), Michael Kröll, Moritz Neuner (of Dornenreich, Abigor, Graveworm, Leaves' Eyes and Angizia) and Georg Razesberger. They released A Kiss in the Charnel Fields in 1995.

In 1997, Kröll and Razesberger left the band and were replaced with Florian Oberlechner (also of Angizia), Herwing Huber, Susanne Eckbauer and Martina Astner. Moritz Neuner remained. This line-up released Dead Like an Angel in 1998. That would be their last release as "Korova". Two years later, they changed to Korovakill.

Niederwieser and Neuner joined Renaud Tschirner, keyboard player for Elend, to continue Korovakill as a trio. They released Waterhells in 2001. Webzine AGM chose Waterhells as the seventh best experimental metal album of the 2000s.

On 21 September 2011, Niederwieser released the solo album PhantasmaChronica under the moniker Chryst. On Chryst's official website, he said of the band's name change,

Chryst is a deconstruction of the Occident. He's the birth of a new world, an inverse universe, created to change your world forever. The revelation is near. Chryst will open the doors of your perception and unearth the hidden treasures of your imagination. The transformation of Korovakill into Chryst is not just a change of name. It's a completely new era of musical revolution!

== Band members ==
=== Current members ===
- Christof Niederwieser – vocals, guitar, keyboards (1990–present)

=== Past members ===
- Moritz Neuner – drums (1990–2011)
- Renaud Tschirner – keyboards (2000–2011)
- Michael Kröll – bass (1990–1997)
- Georg Razesberger – guitars (1990–1997)
- Florian Oberlechner – bass, accordion (1997–2000)
- Herwing Huber – guitars (1997–2000)
- Susanne Eckbauer – theremin, glass organ (1997–2000)
- Martina Astner – vocals (1997–2001)

== Discography ==
- 1995: A Kiss in the Charnel Fields (as Korova)
- 1998: Dead Like an Angel (as Korova)
- 2001: Waterhells (as Korovakill)
- 2011: PhantasmaChronica (as Chryst)
