= Aron Strobel =

- Born: 26 January 1958 (age 68); Schwäbisch Gmünd, West Germany
- Genres: Pop; Rock
- Occupation: Guitarist
- Instrument: Guitar
- Member of: Münchener Freiheit

Aron Strobel (born 26 January 1958) is best known as the lead guitarist for Münchener Freiheit, who had several big hits throughout Europe.

== Background ==
Aron has been a member of the group since their debut in 1982. Although musically well complemented with his fellow band member Stefan Zauner (the two have a writing partnership that continues to this day), Aron's stage presence contrasts the rest of the band, being significantly taller and often written about on fan sites as a 'blonde giant'.

Aron, alongside Zauner, contribute the majority of songs to Freiheit's albums and has co-written many of their well-known hits. Aron has contributed his own songs (sometimes with lyrics co-written with Zauner) which saw him move into an AOR sound, particularly on Wir sehen dieselbe Sonne (1992) and Du weißt es, Ich weiß es (1994).

Aron, along with Stefan Zauner, released the Freiheit offshoot Living in the Sun in 1991 under the name of Deuces Wild.
