= Phantasm =

Phantasm may refer to:

- Apparitional experience, an anomalous experience, quasi-perceptual experience
- Ghost, the disembodied soul or spirit of a dead person or animal

== Film ==
- Phantasm (franchise), a film series
  - Phantasm (film), a 1979 horror film
  - Phantasm II (1988)
  - Phantasm III: Lord of the Dead (1994)
  - Phantasm IV: Oblivion (1998)
  - Phantasm: Ravager (2016)

== Music ==
- Phantasm (early music band), a viol consort
- Phantasm (metal band), a thrash metal band from Los Angeles
- Phantasm (FES), alias for Yui Sakakibara

== Video games ==
- Avenging Spirit, a 1991 arcade game known as Phantasm in Japan
- Phantasmagoria (video game), a 1995 puzzle game released as Phantasm in Japan

== Other uses ==
- Andrea Beaumont, a.k.a. the Phantasm, a DC Comics supervillain
- Danny Chase (Phantasm), a member of the New Teen Titans in DC Comics
- "Phantasms" (Star Trek: The Next Generation), a television episode

== See also ==
- Phantasmagoria (disambiguation)
- Phantom (disambiguation)
- Fantasmagorie (disambiguation)
