= Laure Marsac =

French actress (born 1970)

- Born: 18 February 1970 (age 56); Paris, France
- Occupation: Actor
- Years active: 1984–present
- Spouse: Ivan Taïeb
- Children: 2

Laure Marsac (born 18 February 1970) is a French actress. She has appeared in more than fifty films since 1984 and won the César Award for Best Female Revelation in 1985.

== Personal life ==
Marsac is married to director Ivan Taïeb. Together they have two children, Noémie and Lily.

Lily is an actress and model, in 2016 she was shortlisted for the César Award for Best Female Revelation but she did not earn a nomination (which Marsac won in 1985) for her role as Delphine Dédalus in My Golden Days. Her most notable appearance was in The French Dispatch.

== Filmography ==
=== Film ===
Year	Title	Role	Notes
1984	The Pirate	La jeune fille / The young girl	
1987	In the Shadow of the Wind	Nora Atkins	
1987	The Veiled Man	Claire	
1990	Tumultes	Claude	
1992	Un vampire au paradis	Nathalie Belfond	
1992	Un bout de Challenger	Lena	
1993	Taxi de nuit	Carole	
1994	La Reine Margot	Antoinette	
1994	Interview with the Vampire	Mortal Woman on Stage	
1995	Jefferson in Paris	Young Duchesse	Uncredited
1996	Rainbow pour Rimbaud	Isabelle	
1996	Hit Me	Monique Roux	
1997	La divine poursuite	L'hôtesse du restaurant	
1998	Secret Defense	Véronique / Ludivine	
2007	Le quatrième morceau de la femme coupée en trois	Louise Coleman	
2007	The Key	Florence	
2008	Mesrine	La journaliste interview	
2009	The Queen of Hearts	La femme au téléphone	
2009	Je suis venu pour elle	Valérie	
2010	Turk's Head	Claire, l'amie d'Atom	
2011	Declaration of War	L'auxiliaire puéricultrice	
2013	Le jour attendra	Coralie	
2014	Jacky in Women's Kingdom	Zani, la mèr	
2014	Sire Gauvain et le Chevalier Vert	Dame Bertilak	Short film
2016	Deux escargots s'en vont	(Voice)	Short film

=== Television ===
Year	Title	Role	Notes
1986	L'Ami Maupassant	Berthe	1 episode, "Berthe"
1987	Le Prince Barbare	Bathilde	
1997	Les Infidèles	Juliette	Television film
2004	L'Homme qui venait d'ailleurs	Thérèse	Television film
2007	Les Camarades	Marion	Limited series
2012	Duo	Carole Schuller	Limited series
2012	L'Homme de ses rêves	Emma	Television film
2014	Le Sang de la Vigne	Kate Weller	1 episode, "Massacre à la sulfateuse"
2014	Détectives	Anna Roche	4 episodes
2014, 2025	Capitaine Marleau	Nadia Quemener (2014), Clara Santini (2025)	2 episodes, "Entre Vents et Marées" (2014), "L'Amiral " (2025)
2015	Borderline	Camille Blain	Television film
2015	Casanova	Sylvia Balleti	Television film
2016	Les Petits Meurtres d'Agatha Christie	Déborah Davis	1 episode, "L'Affaire Protheroe"
2017	Parole contre parole	Louise Gauthier	Television film
2019	Mongeville	Iris Blondel	1 episode, "Le Port de l'Angoisse"
2023	Bardot	Christine Gouze-Rénal	Limited series, 4 episodes

=== Music videos ===
Year	Title	Artist	Album
1993	Foule sentimentale	Alain Souchon	C'est déjà ça
1998	Virginie et sa sœur	Hervé Zerrouk	Désaxé

== Awards and nominations ==
Year	Award	Work	Result
1985	César Award for Best Female Revelation	The Pirate	Won
2004	Festival TV de Luchon, Best Supporting Actress	The Man Who Fell to Earth	Won
