= Concert (disambiguation) =

A concert is a form of musical performance.

Concert may also refer to:

== Books ==
- The Concert (play), 1909 play and basis for later films
- The Concert (novel), 1988 novel Koncert në fund të dimrit by Ismail Kadare

== Film and television ==
- The Concert (1921 film), a lost 1921 silent comedy film
- The Concert (1931 film), a 1931 German comedy film
- "The Concert", an episode of ITV Television Playhouse
- The Concert (1961 film), an Australian film
- Le Concert, a 2009 film directed by Radu Mihăileanu

== Television and radio stations ==
- Concertzender, a Dutch radio station
- RNZ Concert, a New Zealand radio station
- Stingray iConcerts, a television channel

== Music ==
- House concert, a private live music event
- The Concert (ballet), a 1956 ballet by Jerome Robbins

=== Albums ===
- The Concert (Creedence Clearwater Revival album), 1980
- The Concert (Barbra Streisand album), 1994
- Concert: The Cure Live, a 1984 album by The Cure
- Kohuept or Концерт, a 1987 album by Billy Joel
- Concerts (Keith Jarrett album), a 1981 album by Keith Jarrett
- Concerts (Henry Cow album), a 1976 album by Henry Cow
- Le concert (Alain Souchon and Laurent Voulzy album), 2016
- Le concert (Vianney album), 2018
- Live Concert (album), 1997 album by Thomas Anders

== Other uses ==
- Concert Communications Services, a telecom firm
- Operation Concert, a 1943 operation by Soviet partisans during the World War II
- The Concert (ter Borch), a painting by Dutch artist Gerard ter Borch
- The Concert (Titian), a painting by Italian artist Titian
- The Concert (Vermeer), a painting by Dutch painter Johannes Vermeer
- Concert Properties, a real estate company headquartered in Vancouver, British Columbia

== See also ==
- Concerto, a form of composition in classical music
- Consort (disambiguation)
