= Consort =

Consort may refer to:

== Music ==
- "The Consort" (Rufus Wainwright song), from the 2000 album Poses
- Consort of instruments, term for instrumental ensembles
- Consort song (musical), a characteristic English song form, late 16th–early 17th centuries

== Places ==
- Consort, Alberta, a village in Alberta, Canada
- Consort Islands, two small islands in the Dion Islands, Marguerite Bay, Antarctica
- Consort Mountain, in the Victoria Cross Ranges, Alberta, Canada

== Titles ==
- Royal consort, a spouse, concubine or companion, in particular the spouse of a reigning monarch:
  - Queen consort, wife of a reigning king
  - Prince consort, husband of a reigning princess or queen
  - King consort, rarely used alternative title for husband of a reigning queen
  - Princess consort, wife of a reigning prince; also, rarely used alternative title for wife of a reigning king
  - Viceregal consort of Canada, spouse of the Governor General of Canada

== Other uses ==
- Consolidated Standards of Reporting Trials (CONSORT), reporting standards for clinical trials
- Consort (nautical), unpowered, fully loaded Great Lakes vessels towed by larger vessels
- Consort Airport, Consort, Alberta, Canada
- CONSORT Colleges, a consortium of college libraries in the U.S. state of Ohio
- HMS Consort (R76), a C-class destroyer of the British Royal Navy
- The Consort, novel by Sara Jeannette Duncan 1912
- The Consort, musical journal of the Dolmetsch Foundation
- The female partner in tantric yab-yum

== See also ==
- Consortium (disambiguation)
- Concert (disambiguation)
