= Rockollection =

Song by Laurent Voulzy
- Released: 1977
- Recorded: over the course of six weeks
- Genre: Pop music
- Length: 11:40 (first version)
- Label: RCA
- Composer: Laurent Voulzy
- Lyricist: Alain Souchon

"Rockollection" is a 1977 French pop song composed and performed by Laurent Voulzy. Alain Souchon contributed the lyrics.

== Background ==
"Recollection" was considered for the title but finally the song was called "Rockollection" (portmanteau of rock and recollection).

The song is a nostalgic first-person recollection of what is presented as a typical 1960s French adolescence. While the story is sung in French, several English-language hits of the 1960s are used to illustrate the memories. An English and Spanish version were made by Voulzy, adapting the lyrics. Since its original release date, he has re-released the song several times in different renditions.

The single was an international success, reaching the Top 10 in several countries in 1977/1978.

== Original version (1977) ==
Total time 11:40

- "The Loco-Motion": Little Eva
- "A Hard Day's Night": The Beatles
- "I Get Around": The Beach Boys
- "Gloria": Them
- "(I Can't Get No) Satisfaction": The Rolling Stones
- "Mr. Tambourine Man": Bob Dylan
- "Massachusetts": Bee Gees
- "Mellow Yellow": Donovan
- "California Dreamin'": The Mamas & the Papas

A shorter 45 RPM single version of the song was also released, stopping after the fifth song.

== Voulzy Tour live version (1994) ==
Total time 18:20

- "The Loco-Motion": Little Eva
- "Ticket to Ride": The Beatles
- "A Hard Day's Night": The Beatles
- "Fun, Fun, Fun": The Beach Boys
- "I Get Around": The Beach Boys
- "You Really Got Me": The Kinks
- "Gloria": Them
- "Let's Spend the Night Together": The Rolling Stones
- "Jumpin' Jack Flash": The Rolling Stones
- "(I Can't Get No) Satisfaction": The Rolling Stones
- "Mr. Tambourine Man": Bob Dylan
- "Massachusetts": Bee Gees
- "Stayin' Alive": Bee Gees
- "No Milk Today": Herman's Hermits
- "Pinball Wizard": The Who
- "Wild Thing": The Troggs
- "California Dreamin'": The Mamas & the Papas
- "Message in a Bottle": The Police

== Le Gothique Flamboyant Pop Dancing Tour live version (2004) ==
Total time 21:30

- "The Loco-Motion": Little Eva
- "From Me to You": The Beatles
- "Day Tripper": The Beatles
- "A Hard Day's Night": The Beatles
- "Fun Fun Fun": The Beach Boys
- I Get Around : The Beach Boys
- "Gloria": Them
- "Paint It, Black": The Rolling Stones
- "(I Can't Get No) Satisfaction": The Rolling Stones
- "Mr. Tambourine Man": Bob Dylan
- "Massachusetts": Bee Gees
- "Night Fever": Bee Gees
- "Superstition": Stevie Wonder
- "The Boxer": Simon & Garfunkel
- "Venus": Shocking Blue
- "Sunny Afternoon": The Kinks
- "California Dreamin'": The Mamas & the Papas
- "On the Road Again": Canned Heat
- "Owner of a Lonely Heart": Yes
- "Message in a Bottle": The Police

== Studio version (2008) ==
For the album Recollection (2008), Laurent Voulzy recorded a new version he titled Rockollection 008 that has a duration of 15:43. The songs used are:

- "Da Doo Ron Ron": The Crystals
- "I Want to Hold Your Hand": The Beatles
- "Ticket to Ride": The Beatles
- "No Milk Today": Herman's Hermits
- "With a Girl Like You": The Troggs
- "Oh, Pretty Woman": Roy Orbison
- "Paint It, Black": The Rolling Stones
- "Ruby Tuesday": The Rolling Stones
- "Jumpin' Jack Flash": The Rolling Stones
- "(I Can't Get No) Satisfaction": The Rolling Stones
- "Turn! Turn! Turn!": The Byrds
- "L'Amour avec toi: Michel Polnareff
- "Massachusetts (song)": Bee Gees
- "How Deep Is Your Love: Bee Gees
- "Night Fever": Bee Gees
- "More Than a Woman": Bee Gees
- "Eleanor Rigby": The Beatles
- "Good Vibrations": The Beach Boys
- "Substitute": The Who
- "Penny Lane": The Beatles
- "Sunny Afternoon": The Kinks
- "California Dreamin'": The Mamas & the Papas

In the same album Rockollection Scène 10, consists of a new song of "Rockollection", followed by an excerpt of "Video Killed the Radio Star" of The Buggles.

With "L'Amour avec toi" from Michel Polnareff, it is the first time that Voulzy included a song in French in his "Rockollection".

== Certifications and sales ==
Region	Certification	Certified units/sales
Argentina	—	200,000
Belgium	—	150,000
Brazil	—	100,000
Canada (Music Canada)	Gold	150,000
France (SNEP)	Platinum	1,800,000
Germany	—	200,000
Italy	—	250,000
Spain	—	250,000
Summaries
Europe	—	4,000,000

== See also ==
- List of best-selling singles by country
