= Les nuits sans Kim Wilde =

Single by Laurent Voulzy
- B-side: "Belle-Île-en-Mer, Marie-Galante"
- Released: 1985
- Genre: Chanson, pop
- Label: RCA
- Songwriters: Laurent Voulzy; Alain Souchon
- Producers: Laurent Voulzy; Michel Cœuriot

"Les nuits sans Kim Wilde" ("The Nights without Kim Wilde") is a single by Laurent Voulzy about British singer Kim Wilde.

The initial idea came from Voulzy's fascination for Kim Wilde. Every time Wilde was on TV he recorded her on tape. During a working night, he played the tape and Alain Souchon, recognising the mix of obsession and admiration of his friend for Wilde, told him to write a song about her. At first Wilde was not very enthusiastic but still thought that it was a nice compliment. Listening to the draft with her family, her father suggested she reply to Voulzy. Wilde decided to record her voice and be in the clip made by Bernard Malige.

Written by Voulzy and Alain Souchon, it contains French and English lyrics and was initially released in France in 1985 after Wilde herself agreed to sing backing vocals on it, and was reissued in 1986, coupled with the song "Belle-île-en-mer, Marie Galante", it did not enter the Top 50, but was the 13th most played song on peripheral radio according to the Media Control chart of 19 August 1985. The song returned a few months later, but this time as the B-side to the single Belle-Île-en-Mer, Marie-Galante, which entered the Top 50 at the end of September 1986 for twenty weeks and reached number 20 for a fortnight.

An official video was made for the song in which Wilde made an appearance, singing some lyrics in both English and French.

The song contributed to Kim Wilde's popularity in France.
