= Ohio Wesleyan University Library =

Coordinates: 40.296524°N 83.068689°W

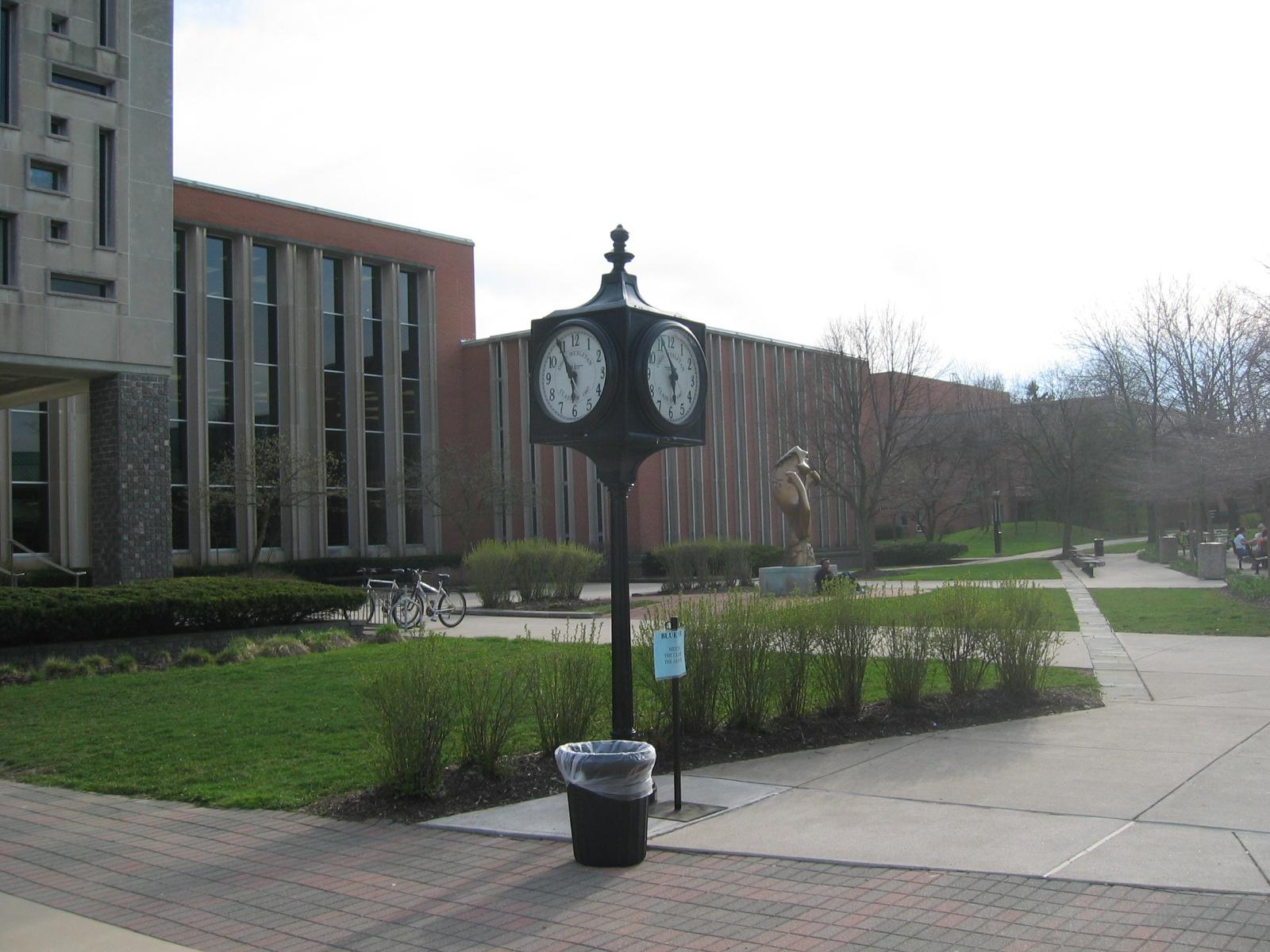

The Ohio Wesleyan University Library is the library system of Ohio Wesleyan University in Delaware, Ohio. It comprises five individual libraries and is the second largest academic library in Ohio among liberal arts colleges, ranked by number of volumes held. Organized into 3 major divisions (main collection, science collection and a music collection), in 2005 it held 600,000 printed volumes in open stacks, 800,000 microfilms and microfiches, and a total of 140,000 maps, motion pictures, DVDs, sound recordings, and computer files in its collections, in addition to extensive digital resources and the University Archives.

== History ==
Initially, the system was a collection of 9000 volumes stored in Slocum Hall. Slocum Hall, built in 1898 served as the University library until 1966 when Beeghly Library was built. Holdings include a strong rare book collection, a solid representation of 19th century periodicals, and print and electronic subscriptions to thousands of periodicals. Housed in Beeghly is one of the country's oldest government publications depositories. All libraries are linked by an integrated online catalog and circulation system, CONSORT.

== Initiatives ==
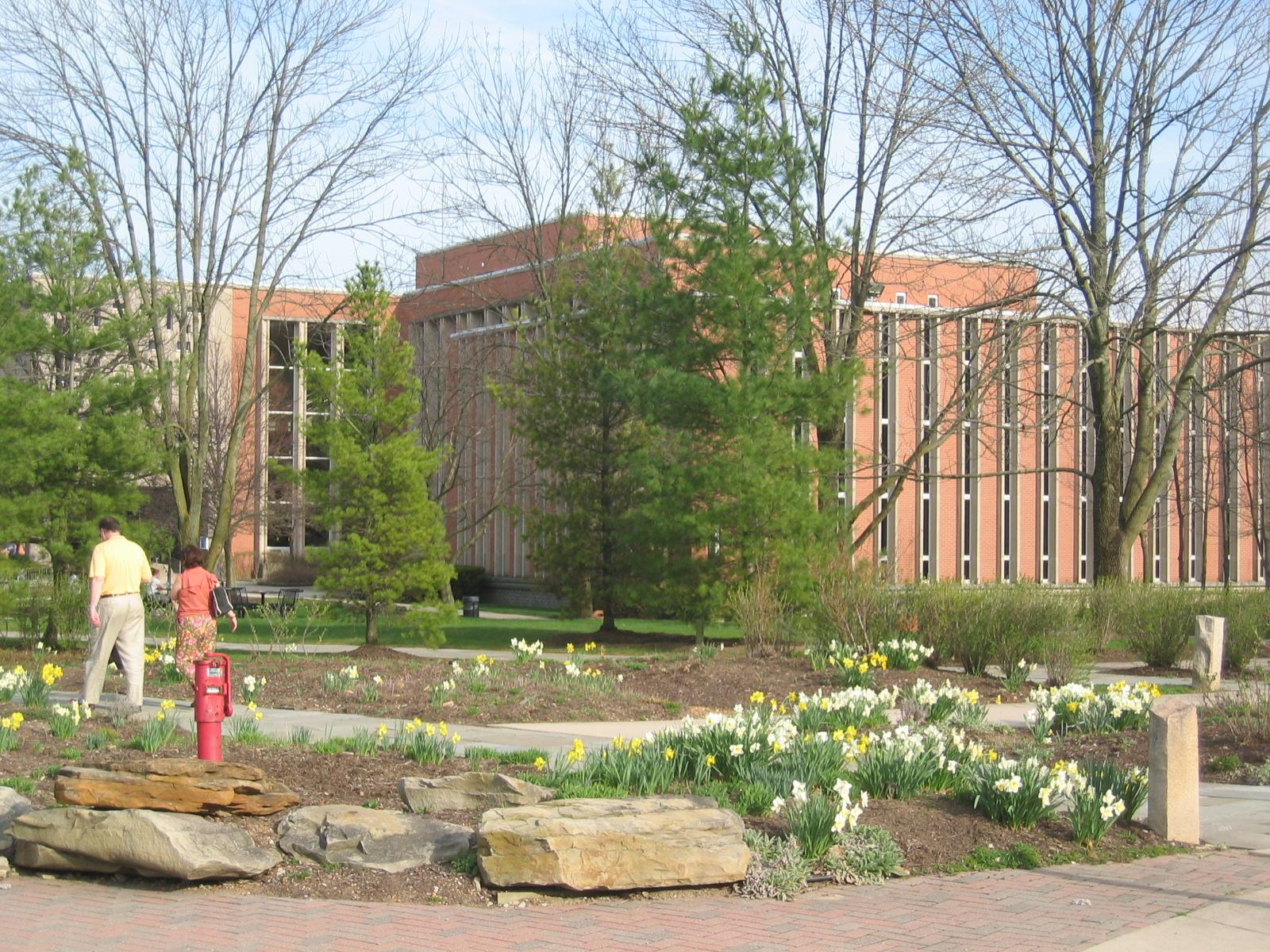
Beeghly Library at Ohio Wesleyan University

Government documents collection plays an active role in furthering online archiving of scientific and historical documents at the school. The Ohio Wesleyan University Beeghly Library has been a federal depository for government publications since 1845, and is one of the oldest continuous federal depository libraries in the United States. The library receives approximately 26% of all publications available for selection through the Federal Depository Library Program, which distributes millions of U.S. government publications to libraries across the countries.

The CONSORT integrated library system is shared with Denison University, Kenyon College, and the College of Wooster and provides access to the combined holdings of all four colleges. The project is aimed at enabling resource sharing with each other and OhioLINK.

The primary purpose of cooperative collection development activities by the four CONSORT Colleges is to maximize the strength, currency, and diversity of the individual collections. A secondary purpose is the simultaneous containment of costs by reducing unnecessary duplication of library materials and the deliberate purchase of more specific materials that would not have been purchased otherwise. The four libraries will also continue to explore and adopt policies and procedures for increased sharing and timely delivery of materials.

== Significant collections ==
- Archives of Ohio United Methodism
- Ohio Wesleyan University Historical Collection
- Rare Books, Manuscripts and Artifacts Collection
- Robert and Elizabeth Barrett Browning Collection
- Kate Greenaway collections
- The Jaccaud presidential collection
- Spanish Civil War Collection
- Abraham Lincoln Collection
- Walt Whitman Collection
- Leaves of Grass Collection
- Other digital collections

== Divisions ==
- Beeghly Library
- Science Center Library
- Music Library
- Early Education Center Library
- Fine Arts Library
