= Paradoxal Système =

1992 single by Laurent Voulzy

Single by Laurent Voulzy

from the album Caché derrière
- B-side: "Ta Plage Beach Boy"
- Released: 1992
- Recorded: 1992
- Genre: Ballad, pop
- Length: 4:38
- Label: Ariola
- Composer(s): Laurent Voulzy
- Lyricist(s): Alain Souchon
- Producer(s): Laurent Voulzy, Michel Coeuriot

Laurent Voulzy singles chronology
"Le soleil donne" (1988)	"Paradoxal Système" (1992)	"Le Rêve du pêcheur" (1992)

"Paradoxal Système" is a 1992 pop-ballad song recorded by French singer Laurent Voulzy. Written by Alain Souchon with music composed by Voulzy, it was the lead single from his third studio album Caché derrière, on which it appears as the eighth track, and was released in June 1992. It was a top ten in France and was heavily aired on radio, and became one of Voulzy's most famous songs.

== Background and writing ==
In interviews, Voulzy explained that "Paradoxal Système" was the first song from Caché derrière on which Alain Souchon and he tried to work, and they did so for two weeks, every day, in Brittany; however, Voulzy was not satisfied with the model they made and, as a consequence, they decided to work on other songs of the album. Almost a year and a half later, when he was driving on the Paris ring road, Porte de Bagnolet, Voulzy had "a flash" when reviewing the model of "Paradoxal Système", particularly when re-reading the sentence: "At night, trains travel to cities and faces". He explained: "These phrases about the unspoken, the loneliness, the sadness, the regrets when you leave someone on a station platform, that was exactly what I wanted to express"; he then understood that the song is "urban, terrestrial, in motion" and about "rails, fog, travel". "Paradoxal Système" is the only song in his discography, along with "Jeanne", which gives him "a very strong feeling" as it seems to him that "it comes from somewhere else", and he thinks he is traveling to Belgium every time he performs it.

== Critical reception ==
When reviewing the new singles releases, Pan-European magazine Music & Media stated: "Is this the male equivalent of Mylène Farmer? It's the same kind of synth-dominated pop with a high IQ level".

== Live performances ==
As the song deals with the physical separation of two lovers, Voulzy likes to end his concerts with "Paradoxal Système". It was included on live albums Voulzy Tour (1992), Lys & Love Tour (2013), Mont-Saint-Michel (2019), as well as on Voulzy's compilations Saisons, le double best of (2003) and Florilège (2020).

== Chart performance ==
In France, "Paradoxal Système" debuted at number 30 on the chart edition of 26 June 1992, reached a peak of number ten in its fifth week, and totalled 16 weeks in the top 50. On the European Hot 100, it started at number 74 on 18 July 1992, reached a peak of number 49 in its third week and totaled six weeks on the chart. Regularly played on radio, it was number one for weeks on the AM National Airplay Chart, and ranked number three on the year-end chart.

== Track listings ==
- CD single
1. "Paradoxal Système" — 4:38
2. "Ta Plage Beach Boy" — 3:50
- 7" single
1. "Paradoxal Système" — 4:38
2. "Ta Plage Beach Boy" — 3:50
- CD maxi
1. "Paradoxal Système" — 4:38
2. "Ta Plage Beach Boy" — 3:50
3. "Paradoxal Système" (instrumental) — 4:38
- 12" maxi - Promo
1. "Paradoxal Système" — 4:38
2. "Ta Plage Beach Boy" — 3:50
3. "Paradoxal Système" (instrumental) — 4:38

== Charts ==
=== Weekly charts ===
Chart (1992)	Peak position
Europe (Eurochart Hot 100)	49
France (Airplay Chart [AM Stations])	1
France (SNEP)	10

=== Year-end charts ===
Chart (1992)	Position
France (Airplay Chart)	3

== Release history ==
Country	Date	Format	Label
France	1992	CD single	Ariola
France	1992	7" single	Ariola
France	1992	CD maxi	Ariola
France	1992	Promotional 12" maxi	Ariola
Germany	1992	7" single	Ariola
