= C'est déjà ça =

Studio album by Alain Souchon
- Released: October 10, 1993
- Recorded: France, 1993
- Genre: Pop
- Length: 41:54
- Label: Virgin
- Producer: Michel Cœuriot

Alain Souchon chronology
Nickel (1990)	C'est déjà ça (1993)	Défoule sentimentale (1995)

Singles from C'est déjà ça
- 1. "Foule sentimentale" Released: October 1993; 2. "L'Amour à la machine" Released: March 1994

C'est déjà ça is a 1993 album recorded by French singer Alain Souchon. It was his eleventh album overall and was released on October 10, 1993. It achieved smash success in France where it remained for 100 weeks in the top 50, including one week at the top, and 108 weeks on the chart. It was also successful in Belgium (Wallonia). It provided two successful singles in France : "Foule sentimentale" (#1) and "L'Amour à la machine" (#21). The album was entirely written by the singer himself, while the music was composed by Laurent Voulzy, Jean-Claude Petit and Souchon's son, Pierre Souchon.

== Critical reception ==
Professional ratings
Review scores
Source	Rating
Allmusic	4/5 stars

The album was certified a Diamond disc with over 1 million copies sold. It also earned several awards, notably earning Souchon the Best male singer of the year award at the 1994 NRJ Music Awards. In 1996, he also won the Vincent Scotto prize awarded by the SACEM for the song "Sous les jupes des filles". This song, not released as a single, was nevertheless much aired on the radio.

== Track listing ==
Title	Length	Writer(s)	Composer(s)
"Foule sentimentale"	5:24	Alain Souchon	Alain Souchon
"L'Amour à la machine"	3:46	Alain Souchon	Alain Souchon
"Sous les jupes des filles"	4:37	Alain Souchon	Alain Souchon
"Les Regrets"	3:59	Alain Souchon	Laurent Voulzy
"Les Filles électriques"	2:13	Alain Souchon	Alain Souchon
"Arlette Laguiller"	4:23	Alain Souchon	Laurent Voulzy
"Chanter c'est lancer des balles"	2:34	Alain Souchon	Alain Souchon
"Sans queue ni tête"	4:06	Alain Souchon	Laurent Voulzy
"Le Fil"	4:06	Alain Souchon	Alain Souchon/Pierre Souchon
"Le Zèbre"	2:54	Alain Souchon	Jean-Claude Petit
"C'est déjà ça"	3:46	Alain Souchon	Laurent Voulzy

Source : Allmusic.

== Releases ==
Date	Label	Country	Format	Catalog
1993	Virgin	Belgium, France, Switzerland	CD	8397182
2003	EMI Music	Belgium, France, Switzerland	CD	839178

== Personnel ==
- Produced by Michel Coeuriot
- Michel-Yves Kochmann : guitares (1, 2, 3, 4, 6, 7, 9, 10, 11)
- Basile Leroux : guitares (7, 10)
- Laurent Voulzy : guitares (8), glide et solo basse (8), chœurs (8)
- Laurent Faucheux : batterie (1, 2, 6, 11)
- Guy Delacroix : basse (1, 2, 4, 6), basse acoustique (7, 10)
- Denis Benarrosch : percussions (1, 3, 4, 6, 10, 11)
- Michel Cœuriot : synthétiseurs (1, 3, 4, 8, 9, 11), orgue hammond (2), piano (5, 7), clavinette (6), basse (8), chœurs (8)
- Celmar Engel : programmations des synthétiseurs (3, 4, 11)
- Recorded by Renaud Letang
  - Assistant : Bertrand Taussac
  - At Studio Ferber and at Studio ICP (Brussel)
- Mixed by Renaud Letang and Michel Cœuriot
  - Assistant : Rodolphe Saguinetti
  - At Studio Guillaume Tell (Paris)
- Mastering : Greg Calbi à Sterling Sound à New York

== Certifications and sales ==
Country	Certification	Date	Sales certified
Belgium	Gold		25,000
France	Diamond	March 29, 1995	1,000,000

== Charts ==
Chart (1993/95)	Peak position
Belgian (Wallonia) Albums Chart	7
French SNEP Albums Chart	1
Chart (2001/02) ^{1}	Peak position
French Albums Chart	37

^{1} Re-issue

End of year chart (1995)	Position
Belgian (Wallonia) Albums Chart	13
