= Le concert (Alain Souchon and Laurent Voulzy album) =

Le Concert

Live album by Alain Souchon and Laurent Voulzy
- Released: 2016
- Recorded: December 2015; July 2016
- Venue: Zénith de Paris
- Label: Columbia

Alain Souchon chronology
Alain Souchon & Laurent Voulzy (2014)	Le Concert (2016)

Laurent Voulzy chronology
Alain Souchon & Laurent Voulzy (2014)	Le Concert (2016)	Belem (2017)

Le Concert is a 2016 live album by Alain Souchon and Laurent Voulzy on Columbia. The singers' first live collaboration, it was recorded at Zénith de Paris, in December 2015, except for the track "Il roule, les fleurs du bal", recorded at the Espace Glenmore, Carhaix, at the Festival des Vieilles Charrues, 16 July 2016. The album reached #15 in the French album charts.

== Track listing ==
Disc 1

1. Dans Le Vent Qui Va 2:46
2. J'Ai Dix Ans 3:30
3. Bubble Star 4:48
4. Jamais Content 3:22
5. Bad Boys 4:34
6. Caché Derrière 5:42
7. Et Si En Plus Y'A Personne 4:17
8. Oiseau Malin 5:53
9. La Baie Des Fourmis 3:25
10. C'Est Déjà Ça 4:43
11. Poulaillers' Song 3:32
12. La Fille D'Avril 3:27
13. Le Rêve Du Pecheur 5:24
14. Somerset Maugham 11:40
15. Bidon 4:32
16. Allô Maman Bobo 3:25
17. La Ballade De Jim 5:41
18. On Était Beau 0:51

Disc 2

1. Souffrir De Se Souvenir 5:10
2. Cœur Grenadine 6:40
3. Le Bagad De Lann-Bihoué 5:37
4. Jeanne 6:06
5. Amélie Colbert
6. Le Soleil Donne 5:30
7. Derrière Les Mots 4:13
8. Le Pouvoir Des Fleurs 5:09
9. Foule Sentimentale
10. Rockollection 9:09
11. Belle-Île-En-Mer, Marie-Galante 4:53
12. Il Roule (Les Fleurs Du Bal) 5:36

Blu-ray 1 The concert

Blu-ray 2 Clip "Il Roule (Les Fleurs Du Bal)"
