= The Pirate (1984 film) =

1984 film

- Directed by: Jacques Doillon
- Written by: Jacques Doillon
- Produced by: Martine Fabre; Carlo Lavizzari; Olivier Lorsac
- Starring: Jane Birkin
- Cinematography: Bruno Nuytten
- Edited by: Noëlle Boisson
- Music by: Philippe Sarde
- Distributed by: AMLF
- Release date: 23 May 1984
- Running time: 88 minutes
- Country: France
- Language: French

The Pirate (French: La Pirate) is a 1984 French drama film directed by Jacques Doillon. It was entered into the 1984 Cannes Film Festival.

== Plot summary ==
The film follows Alma, a woman torn between two intense relationships. Married to a man who is deeply attached to her, she struggles with her growing passion for Carole, another woman with whom she shares a turbulent and destructive bond. The story unfolds as Alma tries to reconcile her conflicting emotions, but the rivalry between her husband and Carole escalates, pulling her further into a cycle of obsession, jealousy, and emotional dependence.

The narrative is presented in a claustrophobic, dialogue-driven style, focusing more on the psychological conflict between the characters than on external events.

== Cast ==
- Jane Birkin as Alma
- Maruschka Detmers as Carole
- Philippe Léotard as n° 5
- Andrew Birkin as Andrew, le mari
- Laure Marsac as L'enfant
- Michael Stevens as Concierge de l'hôtel
- Didier Chambragne as Le coursier
- Arsène Altmeyer as Le taxi
