= The Concert (Titian) =

Painting by Titian

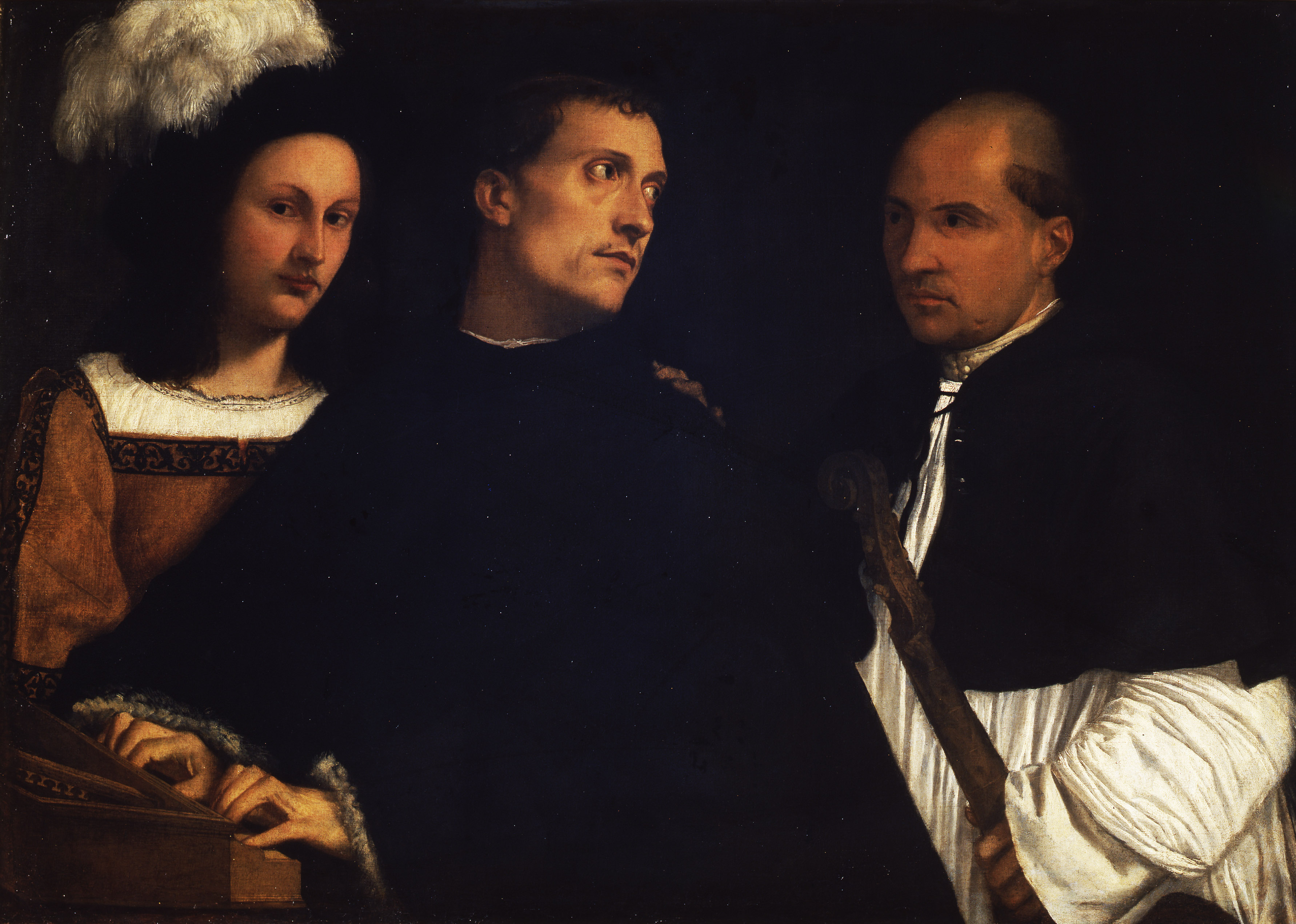
The Concert (c. 1543-1564) by Titian

The Concert or The Interrupted Concert is a c. 1510–1511 oil on canvas painting by Titian, now in the Galleria Palatina, in Florence. A copy in the Galleria Borghese, in Rome, includes an additional fourth figure.

== History ==
In 1678 Carlo Ridolfi saw a work on a similar subject in Paolo del Sera's collection, possibly the work now in the Galleria Palatina. The latter is first definitively recorded in 1654, when it was acquired as a Giorgione work by cardinal Leopoldo de' Medici, whose collections later merged with that of the Grand Duchy of Tuscany.

Sebastiano del Piombo and Giovanni Cariani have also been mentioned in the past as possible alternative attributions. First proposed in 1896 by Giovanni Morelli, the attribution to Titian is now generally accepted. An upper strip of canvas, added to the work at a later date, was removed in 1976–1978. That restoration also re-dated the work from c. 1521 to 1555–1589.

Conductor Bruno Walter mentions that Gustav Mahler had a reproduction of the painting hanging on his wall. Walter however, writing in the 1930s, identifies the painting as by Giorgione, not Titian, "...I entered his study and my first glance was arrested by a reproduction of Giorgione's "Concerto" which hung on the wall. Who is the monk, I asked myself, who, his hands on the keys, seems to have stopped in his playing to turn around? What has he to do with Mahler whom he so strangely resembles? And I recall that, for a long time to come, I mysteriously identified the ascetic monk of the painting with Mahler."

== See also ==
- List of works by Titian
