= Consortium (disambiguation) =

A consortium is an association of two or more entities with the objective of participating in a common activity or pooling their resources for achieving a common goal. The term may also refer to:

- Microbial consortium, a group of symbiotic microbes
- Loss of consortium, the deprivation of the benefits of a family relationship due to injuries caused by a tortfeasor
- Consortium (band), 1960s British band
- Consortium (video game), a game by Interdimensional Games
- Library consortium, a group of coordinated libraries
