= Foule sentimentale =

Single by Alain Souchon

from the album C'est déjà ça
- Released: October 1993
- Recorded: 1993
- Genre: Pop
- Label: Virgin
- Songwriter(s): Alain Souchon
- Producer(s): Michel Coeuriot

Alain Souchon singles chronology
"Quand j'serai K.O" (1989)	"Foule sentimentale" (1993)	"L'Amour à la machine" (1994)

"Foule sentimentale" is a 1993 popular song written, composed and performed by the French artist Alain Souchon. The song was released as a single in October 1993 and was the first one from his 1993 album C'est déjà ça. It achieved success in France.

== Lyrics and music ==
In this song, Alain Souchon criticizes "the superfluity of the materialistic society". In the lyrics, he also cites Paul-Loup Sulitzer and Claudia Schiffer as examples of people highlighted in the media for their success in their respective fields, saying thus all that causes great harm to the TV viewers.

== Critical reception ==
According to the magazine Platine, this song was "clean and efficient".

The song won the award of the song of the year at the 1994 Victoires de la Musique and the Victory of Victories of the original song of the last twenty years in 2005.

== Chart performances ==
The song appeared on the French SNEP Singles Chart from 30 October 1993 to 9 April, then from 23 to 30 April 1994. Thus it stayed for 26 weeks on the chart and jumped from #14 to #1 on 12 February 1994. The song has become one of the most emblematic songs of the singer.

== Covers and tributes ==
In 1997, the song was covered by Les Enfoirés and features on their album Sol en Si (track 15, 5:09), released on 6 October. It was performed by Francis Cabrel, Michel Jonasz, Catherine Lara, Maxime Le Forestier, Maurane, Zazie and Alain Souchon himself.

In 2006, the song was also covered in Portuguese-language by the female singer Bia under the name "Tão Sentimental" (3:14), that features on her album Coeur Vagabond.

The song also exists in the Russian-language by DJ Smash under the name "Москва ждёт Февраль" (4:17). Rose and Renan Luce covered it live in the French television show Pour Haïti, broadcast on 24 January 2010 on France 2.

In The Netherlands, Herman Van Veen used the music of the song in one of his children theatre shows about Alfred J. Kwak. The song is called Andere Namen.

As tribute to this song, French singer-songwriter Renaud wrote the song "Sentimentale mon cul" in 2006 on his album Rouge Sang.

== Charts ==
Chart (1994)	Peak position
French SNEP Singles Chart	1

== Certifications and sales ==
Certifications for "Foule sentimentale"
Region	Certification	Certified units/sales
France (SNEP)	Silver	125,000^{*}
^{*} Sales figures based on certification alone.
