= Romann Berrux =

French actor (born 2001)

- Born: Romann Berrux; 13 August 2001 (age 24); France
- Occupation: Actor
- Years active: 2007–present

Romann Berrux (born 13 August 2001) is a French actor known for his roles as Hugo Roche on the French television show Détectives and as young Fergus on the Starz drama Outlander.

== Career ==
Berrux began working professionally as an actor in his home country of France at the age of five. In 2016, he began studying acting with Clarence Tokley at the Bilingual Acting Workshop's BAW Teen Film Acting Workshop in Paris.

The part of Fergus in seasons 2 and 3 of Outlander was Berrux's first English-speaking role. He was succeeded in the role by French actor César Domboy, who portrays the adult version of the character.

== Filmography ==
=== Television ===
Year	Title	Character	Notes
2008	Joséphine, ange gardien	Rémi	Episode: "Le festin d'Alain"
2009	Brigade Navarro	Romain	Episode: "Mascarade"
2010	Le juge est une femme	Tom Blanchard	Episode: "Les enfants de la lumière"
2010	Medical Emergency	Lucas	Episode: "Eau et gaz à tous les étages"
2013–2014	Détectives	Hugo Roche	Recurring role, 16 episodes
2016–2017	Outlander	Fergus	Recurring role, 12 episodes
2018–2019	The Inside Game	Damien Forrest	TV mini-series

=== Film ===
Year	Title	Character	Notes
2007	Le coeur des hommes 2	Gaston	
2008	Miroir, mon beau miroir	Ludo	TV movie
2010	Summer Camp	Jules	TV movie
2011	The Robbed Robber	Gaëtan Fauvet	TV movie
2012	Kirikou and the Men and Women	Kirikou	Voice
2014	Stroke of Luck	Marius Fares	TV movie
2019	Huguette	Rémi	TV movie
