= The Concert (ter Borch) =

Painting by Gerard ter Borch

- Het concert (Dutch)
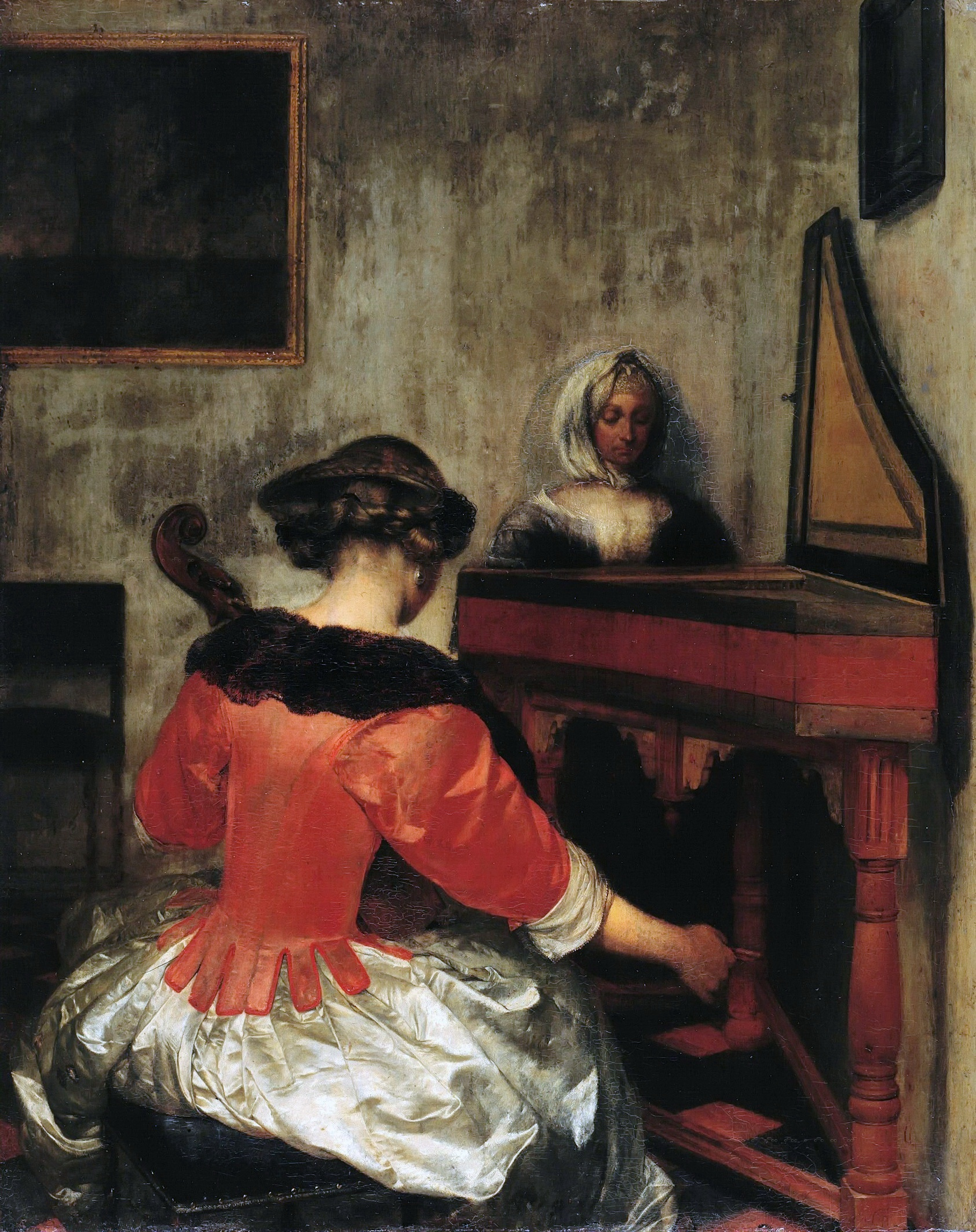
- Artist: Gerard ter Borch
- Year: c. 1673–1675
- Medium: Oil on panel
- Dimensions: 56 cm × 44 cm (22 in × 17 in)
- Location: Gemäldegalerie; Berlin

The Concert is an oil on panel painting by the Dutch artist Gerard ter Borch, created c. 1673–1675. The work is held in the Gemäldegalerie, in Berlin.

== History and description ==
Ter Borch was a painter who paid a lot of attention to the narrative aspects in his paintings. In psychologically suggestive scenes, he calls for interpretation about the depicted event and the interaction that takes place within. He consciously appeals to a certain curiosity about the thoughts or state of mind of the characters. He hardly gives any indications, not even in the titles, about what happens in the scene. Viewers are allowed to construct their own story. Its also the case in the present work.

The Concert depicts two young women playing musical instruments in a domestic environment. The woman in the foreground plays the cello, while the young lady in the background plays the harpsichord. The mutual relationship between the two figures remains uncertain. The cellist, promintely depicted, is seated with her back to the viewer. She also attracts most of attention with her clothing in contrasting bright white and red tones. The carefully rendered textures and the metallic reflection of her white dress and red jacket are characteristic of Ter Borch's method. However, several other stylistic aspects in this work are not, such as the remarkably brightly lit room, the figure placed in the background, depicted in a loose brush, and the use of broad brushstrokes elsewhere. This apparent break in the artist style is largely due to two radical changes that the painting suffered since its creation.

Ter Borch himself made a first change in the painting by changing the gender of the figure playing the harpsichord, who was originally a young man, to a woman. This is apparent in the X-ray examinations and can also be established on the basis of a faithful copy that the painter probably himself made, which now hangs in the Stedelijk Museum, in Zwolle, with the title Couple Making Music. The reason for this conversion is not known for sure, it might have to do with the creation of a desired narrative aspect, but possibly also with the client's wish. In view of the much work that was needed, the action did not seem to have gone easily, or at least not to have been quickly satisfied.

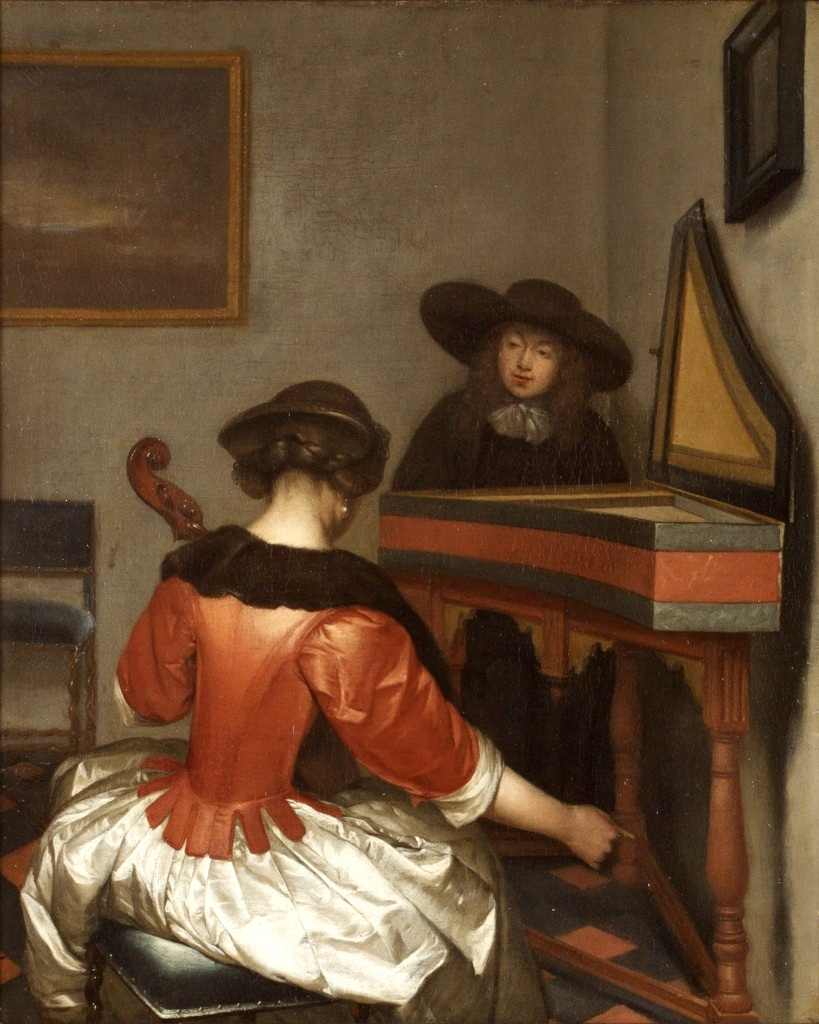
Couple Making Music, a copy attributed to Gerard ter Borch

A second change took place in 1893, when the Berlin professor Hauser radically restored the work, who was then in a poor condition, greatly enhancing the colours. Hauser, however, went further than might be considered acceptable among restorers from a point of view of authenticity. In particular, he decided on a drastic reworking of the female figure in the background, where her dress was completely revised. Hauser also painted over other parts of the work with his own loose, broad brushwork, including the large surface of the background. As a result, the work lost its typical smooth and refined structure, and acquired an almost impressionistic character.

What is more special about this work, however, is that it carries a strong quality in itself, even in its perhaps too drastically restored condition. This underlines how close the classical 17th-century Dutch painting was to more contemporary and realistic movements such as impressionism, as well as how the keynote of a painting can be changed radically with just a few adjustments.
