= Consort Islands =

Islands in Antarctica

- Location within Antarctic Peninsula

Geography
- Location: Antarctica
- Coordinates: 67°52′S 68°42′W

Administration
- Administered under the Antarctic Treaty System

Demographics
- Population: Uninhabited

The Consort Islands are two small islands in Marguerite Bay, lying 1 kilometre (0.5 nmi) northeast of Emperor Island in the Dion Islands. The Dion Islands were first sighted and roughly charted in 1909 by the French Antarctic Expedition. The Consort Islands were surveyed in 1948 by the Falkland Islands Dependencies Survey and so named by the UK Antarctic Place-Names Committee because of their association with Emperor Island.

== See also ==
- List of Antarctic and sub-Antarctic islands
