= CONSORT Colleges =

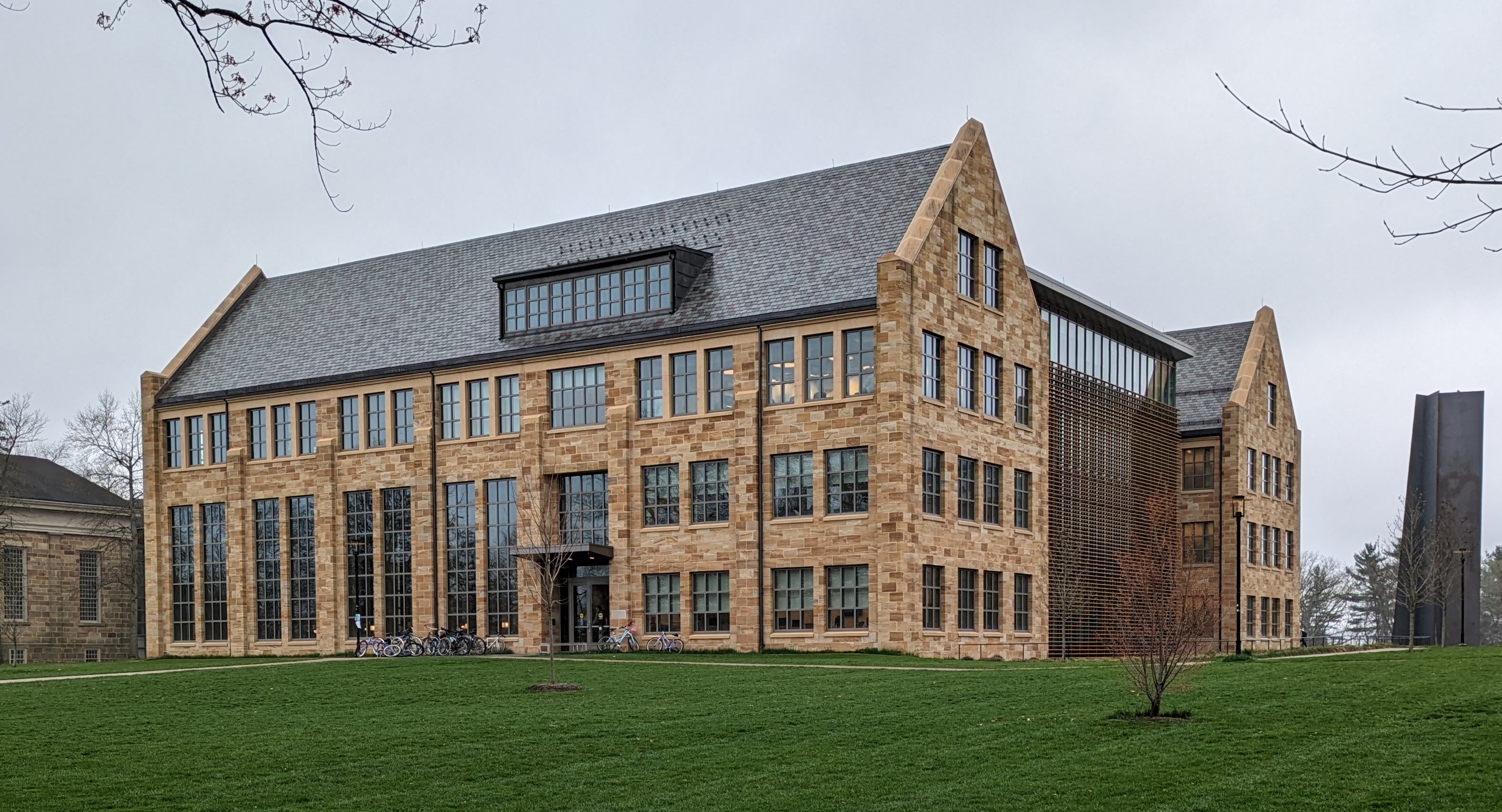
Chalmers Library at Kenyon College

CONSORT Colleges was a term used to refer to the consortium of four academic libraries in Ohio: Denison University, Kenyon College, Ohio Wesleyan University and The College of Wooster. The primary objective of this collaboration was to share the cost of library resources and services including: the CONSORT integrated library system; CONStor, a high density off-site storage facility; cooperative collection development; library technical services work flow redesign; and an information literacy tutorial.

The CONSORT Colleges along with Oberlin College comprise the Five Colleges of Ohio.

== CONSORT ==
CONSORT was the name of the combined integrated library system shared by the CONSORT Colleges. The platform was dissolved in June 2025 with the statewide migration to the Alma/Primo products.
