= Laurent Voulzy =

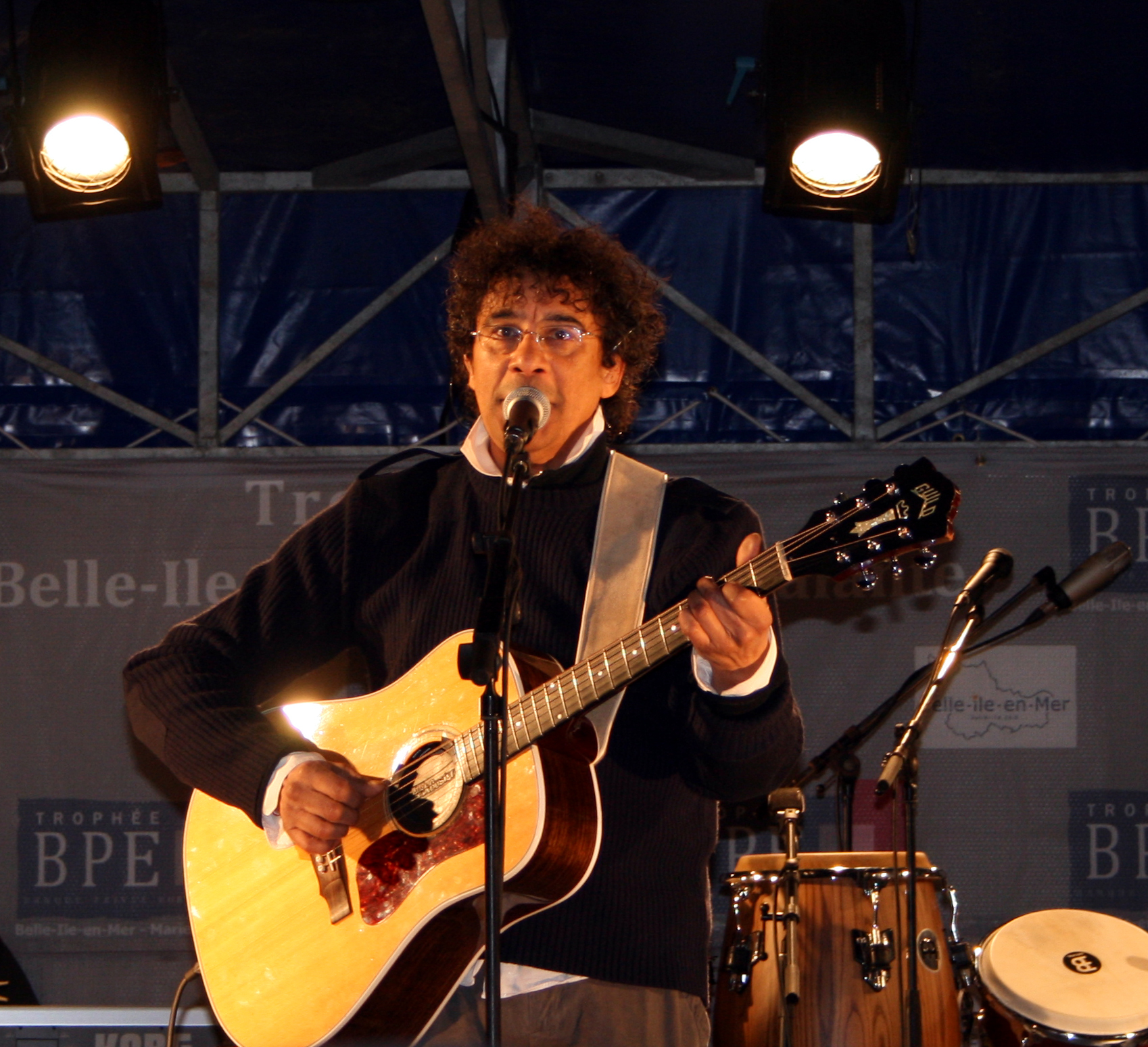

Background information
- Born: Lucien Voulzy; 18 December 1948 (age 77); Paris, France
- Genres: Alternative rock; French pop; pop rock; experimental; chanson; soft rock
- Occupations: Singer; songwriter; composer
- Instrument: Guitar
- Years active: 1969–present
- Website: laurentvoulzy.com <FR>

Lucien Voulzy (French pronunciation: [lysjɛ̃ vulzi], born 18 December 1948), better known as Laurent Voulzy ([lɔʁɑ̃ vulzi]), is a French musician, singer, songwriter and composer.

== Life and career ==
Laurent Voulzy was born in Paris, France. Early in his musical career, he led the English-pop-influenced group Le Temple de Vénus before joining singer Pascal Danel as a guitarist from 1969 to 1974. Voulzy is best known for his long-standing songwriting collaboration with Alain Souchon, as well as for his own successful solo career as a singer.

He achieved international recognition with the 1977 hit single "Rockollection", which combined original French lyrics with excerpts from classic rock songs in English. Among his other major hits are "Paradoxal Système", which reached the Top 10 in France, and "Le Soleil Donne", a multilingual song featuring lyrics in French, English, Portuguese, and Spanish.

Another notable success was the double single "Belle-Île-en-Mer, Marie-Galante"/"Les Nuits Sans Kim Wilde", the latter inspired by English pop singer Kim Wilde.

Other popular titles in his discography include "Bopper en larmes", "Le Cœur Grenadine", and "Désir, désir". Voulzy's music also found success in Belgium, Switzerland, and Québec, often incorporating multiple languages in his lyrics, including English, Spanish, Portuguese, and German.

In 2005, Voulzy co-produced and co-composed Nolwenn Leroy's second album, Histoires Naturelles.

His 2006 album La Septième Vague topped the French charts. It included a cover of "All I Have to Do Is Dream" by the Everly Brothers, recorded as a duet with Irish singer Andrea Corr. The track was released as a single and featured on The Corrs' compilation album Dreams: The Ultimate Corrs Collection.

In 2007, Voulzy recorded a duet with French guitarist Jean-Pierre Danel for Danel's album Guitar Connection 2. The song reached No. 7 on the French charts in 2008. That same year, he also toured throughout France.

In 2011, Voulzy released the album Lys and Love, which featured the song "Ma seule amour", a duet with Roger Daltrey, lead singer of The Who.

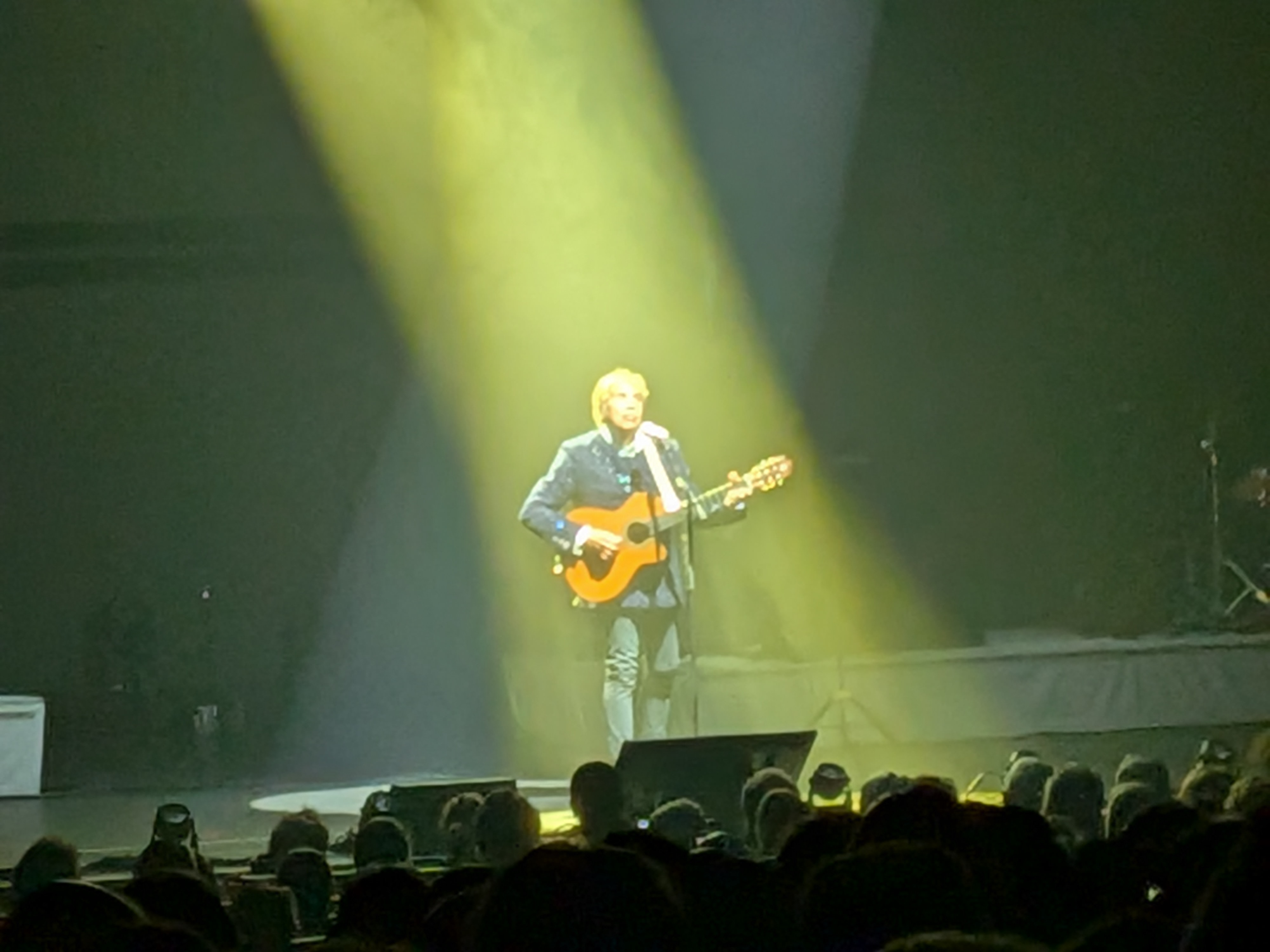
Laurent Voulzy on stage at the salle Pleyel of Paris, on 01/19/2026

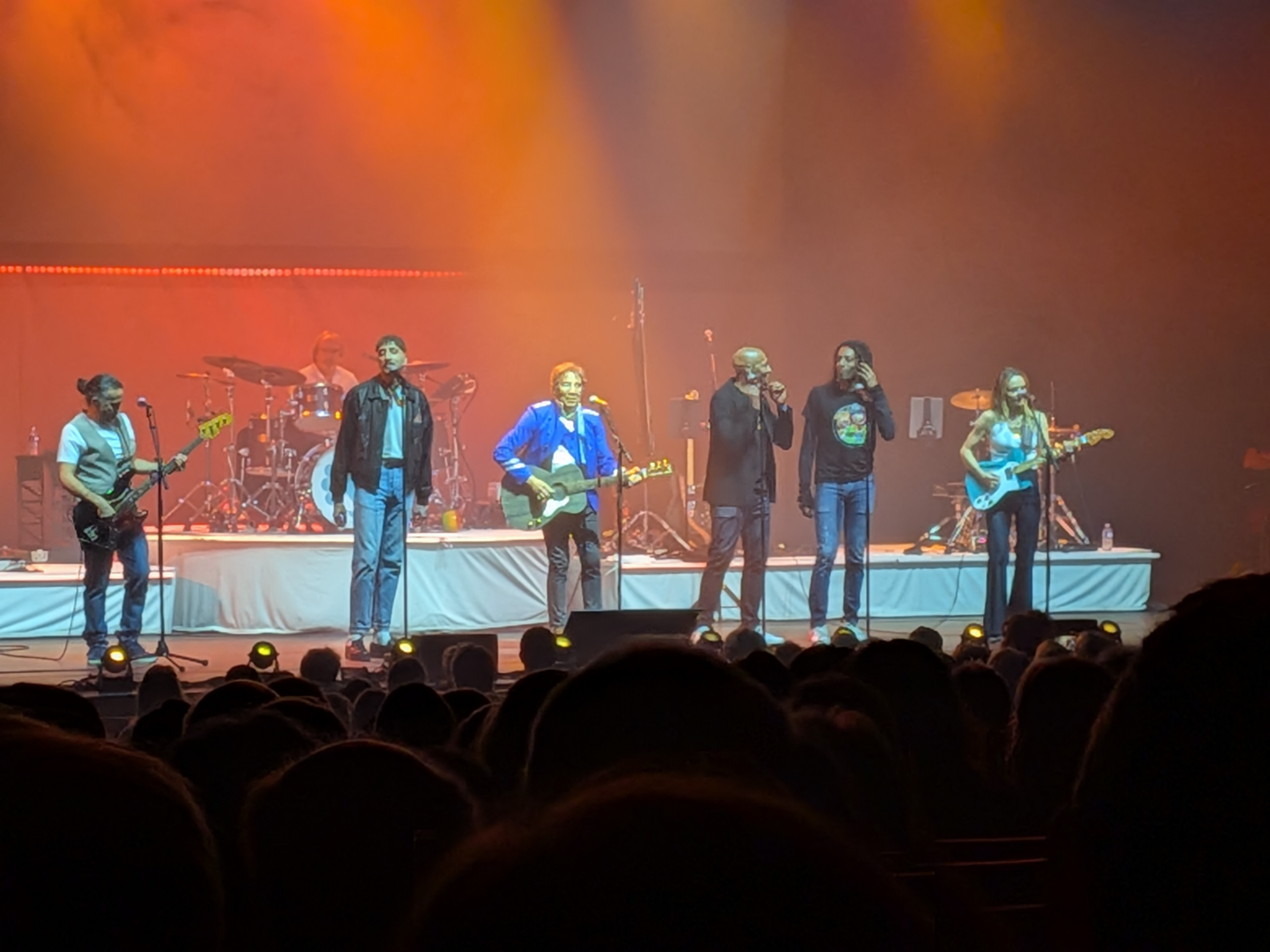
Laurent Voulzy on stage at the salle Pleyel of Paris, on 01/19/2026

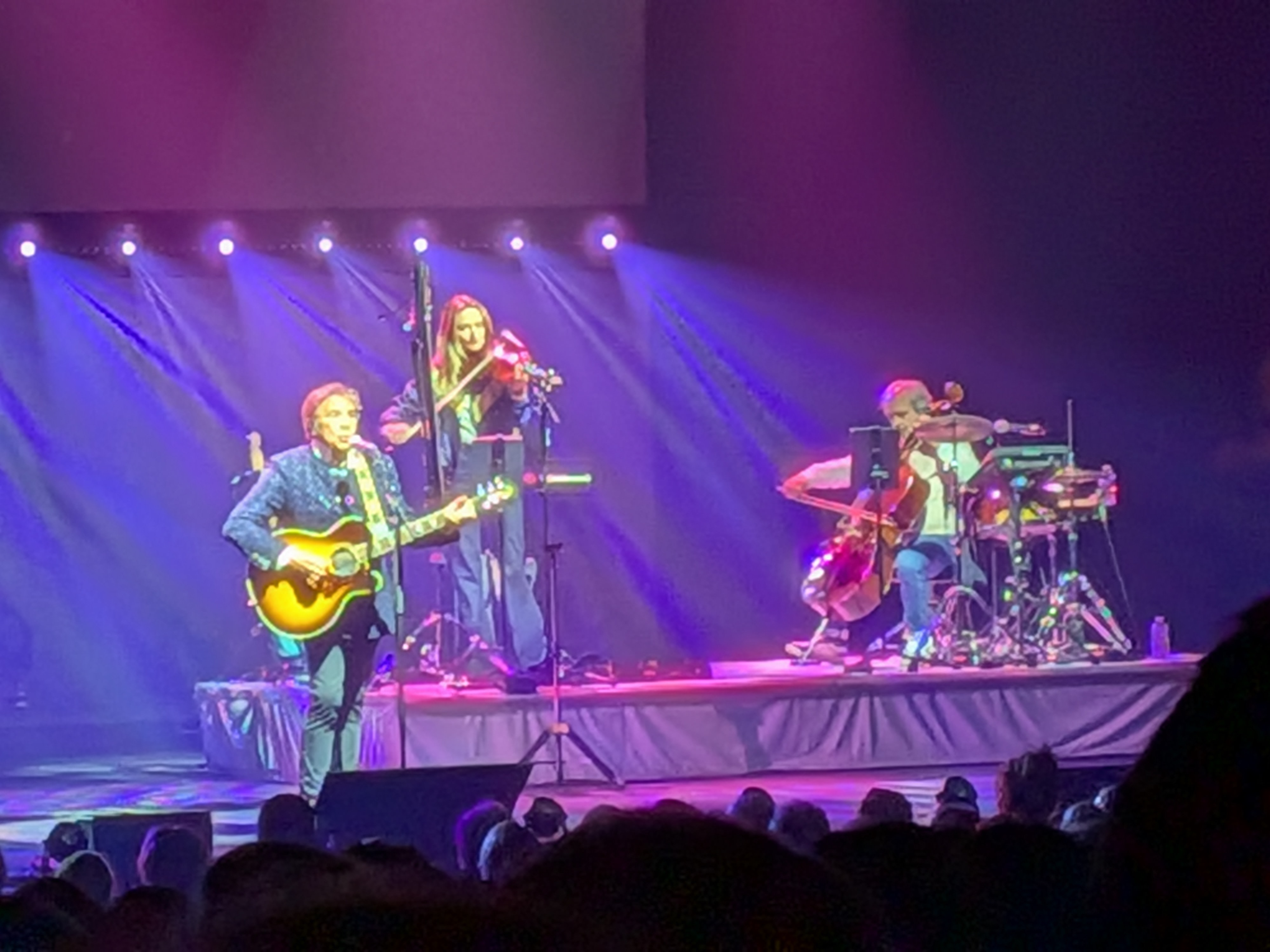
Laurent Voulzy on stage at the salle Pleyel of Paris, on 01/19/2026

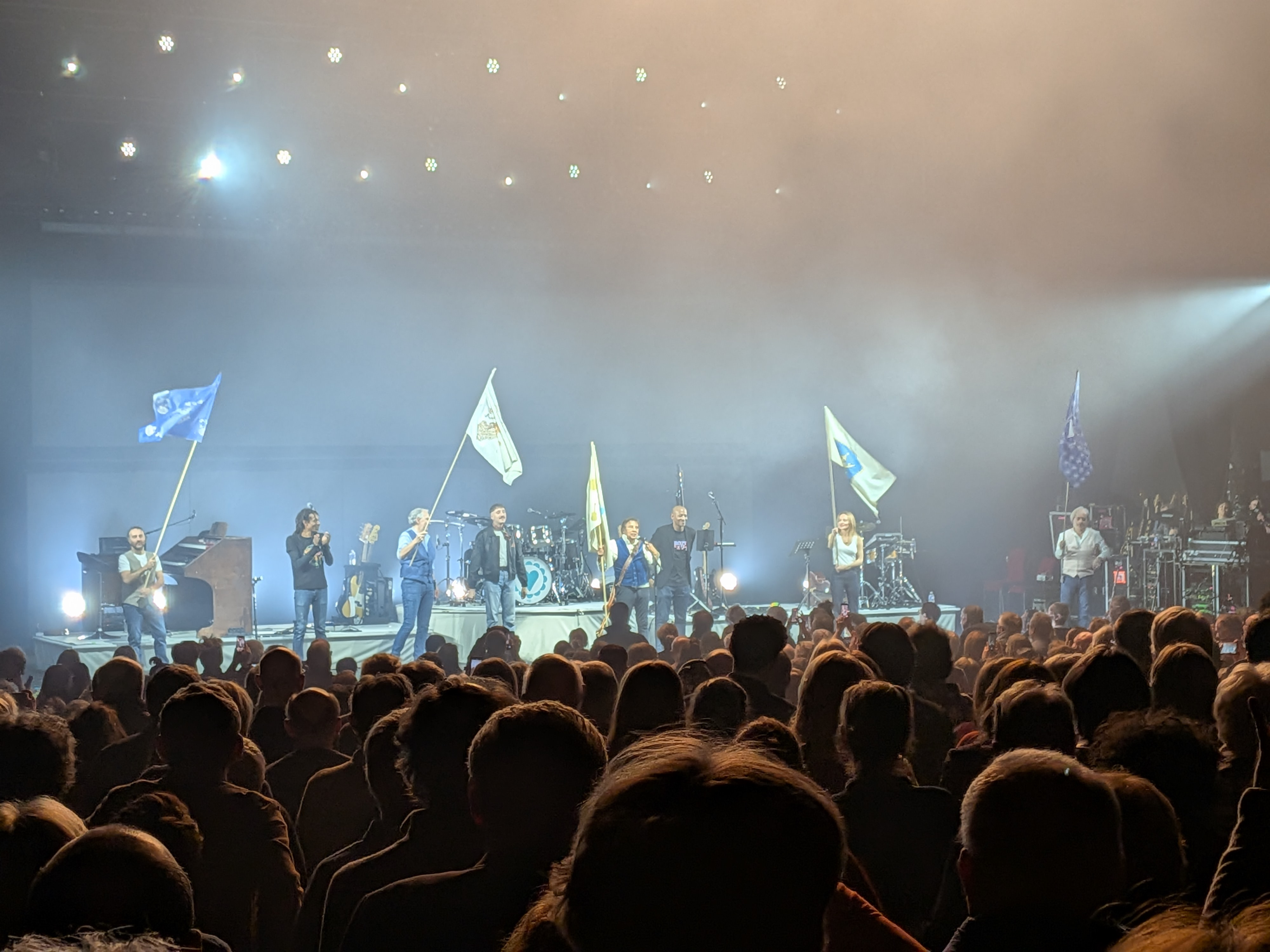
Laurent Voulzy on stage at the salle Pleyel of Paris, on 01/19/2026

== Discography ==
=== Studio albums ===
Year	Album	Record label	Peak positions			
Year	Album	Record label	FR	BEL (Fl)	BEL (Wa)	SWI
1979	Le Cœur grenadine	RCA				
1983	Bopper en larmes	RCA				
1992	Caché derrière	Ariola	9			
2001	Avril	RCA	3	—	4	50
2006	La Septième Vague	RCA	1	—	1	7
2008	Recollection	RCA	2	—	1	20
2011	Lys & Love	Columbia	2	—	1	30
2014	Alain Souchon & Laurent Voulzy (joint album with Alain Souchon)	Parlophone	1	117	1	8
2017	Belem	Columbia	5	—	4	31
2020	Florilège	Columbia	43	—	20	95

=== Live albums ===
Year	Album	Record label	Peak positions		
Year	Album	Record label	FR	BEL (Wa)	SWI
1994	Voulzy Tour	Ariola	5		
2004	Le Gothique flamboyant pop dancing tour	RCA	10	12	
2013	Lys & Love Tour (live)	Columbia	18	28	
2019	Mont Saint-Michel (live)	Columbia	24	24	89

=== Compilations ===
Year	Album	Record label	Peak positions		
Year	Album	Record label	FR	BEL (Wa)	SWI
2002	Les Essentiels 1977–1988	RCA	6		
2003	Saisons, Le double best of 1977–2003	RCA	2	8	46
2012	Belle île en mer 1977–1988	Columbia	167	–	–

=== Singles ===
- 1977: "Rockollection"
- 1978: "Bubble Star"
- 1979: "Le Cœur grenadine"
- 1979: "Karin Redinger"
- 1979: "Cocktail chez Mademoiselle"
- 1980: "Surfing Jack"
- 1981: "Idéal simplifié"
- 1983: "Bopper en larmes"
- 1983: "Liebe"

Year	Title	Peak positions			Sales
Year	Title	FR	BEL (Wa)	SWI	Sales
1984	"Désir désir" (duo with Véronique Jannot)	29			FRA: 600,000
1985	"Belle-Île-en-Mer, Marie Galante" / "Les Nuits Sans Kim Wilde" (featuring Kim Wilde)	20			
1987	"My Song of You"	31			
1989	"Le soleil donne"	21			
1992	"Paradoxal Système"	10			
1993	"Le pouvoir des fleurs"	–			
1993	"Caché derrière"	–			
1993	"Le rêve du pêcheur"	37			
1995	"Rockollection (Live 95)"	37	39		
2001	"Une héroïne"	–	–		
2002	"La fille d'Avril"	26	8 (Ultratip)		
2002	"Amélie Colbert"	36	–		
2003	"Là où je vais"	–	–		
2006	"Derniers baisers"	8	17	96	
2008	"My Song of You" (instrumental duo with Jean-Pierre Danel)	–	–	–	
2008	"Jelly Bean"	–	3 (Ultratip)	–	
2009	"Le vent qui va"	–	–	–	
2011	"Jeanne"	14	4	–	
2012	"C'était déjà toi"	–	6 (Ultratip)	–	
2012	"En regardant vers le pays de France" (featuring Nolwenn Leroy, backing vocals)	–	15 (Ultratip)	–	
2014	"Derrière les mots" (duet with Alain Souchon)	35	22	–	
2014	"La baie des fourmis" (duet with Alain Souchon)	197	–	–	
2017	"Spirit of Samba" (featuring Chyler Leigh, Nina Miranda and Luisa Maita)	99	–	–	
