= Alain Souchon =

French singer-songwriter and actor (born 1944)

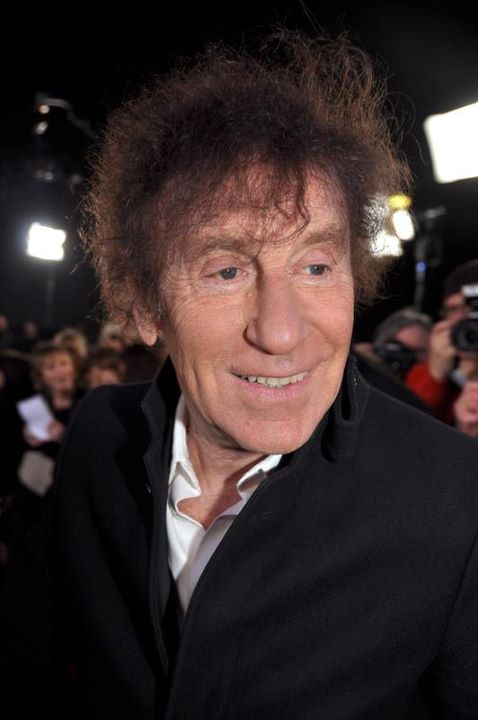
- Alain Souchon in 2012

Background information
- Born: Alain Édouard Kienast; 27 May 1944 (age 82); Casablanca, Morocco
- Origin: Paris, France
- Genres: Alternative rock French pop Pop rock New wave Synthpop; Experimental; Chanson; Techno
- Occupation: Singer-songwriter
- Instruments: Vocals, guitar
- Years active: 1971–present
- Labels: RCA (1973–1984), Virgin (1985–present)
- Website: alainsouchon.net

Alain Souchon (French pronunciation: [alɛ̃ suʃɔ̃]; born Alain Édouard Kienast [alɛ̃ edwaʁ kinas(t)]; 27 May 1944) is a French singer-songwriter and actor. He has released 15 albums and has played roles in seven films.

== Profile ==
Alain Souchon was born in Casablanca, Morocco. His mother’s family was of Swiss origin, and he holds dual French-Swiss nationality. When he was six months old, the family relocated to France. At age 15, Souchon's father died in an accident. Subsequently, his mother sent him to a French high school in England, but due to enrollment issues, he remained in London, where he worked for a time. Upon returning to France, he developed an interest in music, learning to play the guitar under the influence of British and American artists.

In 1970, Souchon married and had his first son. During this period, he began performing in cabarets and bars on the Rive Gauche in Paris.

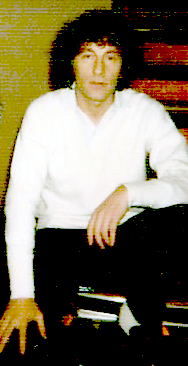
Souchon in 1978

In 1971, he signed his first recording contract with the Pathe-Marconi label, though it did not lead to commercial success. His career gained momentum when Bob Socquet, artistic director at RCA, encouraged him to perform the song "L'amour 1830" at the Rose d'Or festival in Antibes. Around this time, Souchon began collaborating with composer and arranger Laurent Voulzy. Although they wrote songs together, each pursued a solo recording career.

Souchon achieved his first major success with the 1974 single "J'ai 10 ans", the title track of his debut album. He continued to release albums throughout the 1970s, and in 1978 he composed the theme song for François Truffaut's film L'amour en fuite (Love on the Run). That same year, his second son was born.

In 1980, Souchon was invited to perform at l'Olympia, a prestigious Parisian concert venue. He also launched his acting career, earning critical acclaim for his role in the 1983 film L'été meurtrier. Following the release of his album On avance, Souchon left RCA and, at age 40, signed with Virgin Records. In 1989, his song "La beauté de Ava Gardner" was named Best Song of the Year by the Victoires de la Musique.

In 1993, Souchon released what would become one of his most iconic songs, "Foule sentimentale", featured on the million-selling album C'est déjà ça. At the 1995 Victoires de la Musique awards, the song won the award for Best Original Song. The following year, he received the Prix Vincent Scotto from SACEM (Société des Auteurs, Compositeurs et Éditeurs de Musique) for the song "Sous les jupes des filles".

Souchon returned in 2005 with the commercially successful album La vie Théodore, which included the hit single "...Et si en plus y'a personne".

== Discography ==
=== Studio albums ===
Year	Album	Record label	FRA	BEL (Fl)	BEL (Wa)	SWI	Sales
1974	J'ai dix ans	RCA	–	–	–	–	
1976	Bidon	RCA	–	–	–	–	
1977	Jamais content	RCA	1	–	–	–	France: Gold (100,000)
1978	Toto 30 ans, rien que du malheur...	RCA	1	–	–	–	France: Gold (100,000)
1980	Rame	RCA	5	–	–	–	France: Gold (100,000)
1983	On avance	RCA	16	–	–	–	France: Gold (100,000)
1985	C'est comme vous voulez	Virgin	108^{A}	–	–	–	
1988	Ultra moderne solitude	Virgin	6	–	–	–	France: Gold (100,000)
1993	C'est déjà ça	Virgin	1	–	7	–	France: Diamond (1,000,000+)
1997	Sol en si (with Francis Cabrel, Michel Jonasz, Catherine Lara, Maxime le Forestier, Maurane, Zazie)	Virgin	3	–	–	–	
1999	Au ras des pâquerettes	Virgin	1	–	5	74	France: Diamond (1,206,000)
2005	La Vie Théodore	Virgin	1	–	1	3	France: 2xPlatinum (462,100)
2008	Écoutez d'où ma peine vient	Virgin	1	–	2	27	France: Platinum (200,000)
2011	À cause d'elles	Virgin	8	–	11	90	France: Platinum (200,000)
2014	Alain Souchon & Laurent Voulzy (jointly with Laurent Voulzy)	Parlophone	1	117	1	8	
2019	Âme fifties	Parlophone	2	152	2	6	

=== Live albums ===
Year	Album	Record label	FRA	BEL (Wa)	SWI	Sales
1984	Olympia 83	RCA	–	–	–	
1990	Nickel	Virgin	49^{A}	–	–	France: Gold (100,000)
1995	Défoule sentimentale – Live (2 CDs)	Virgin	–	9	–	France: 2xGold (200,000)
2002	J'veux du live	Virgin	29	26	–	France: Gold (100,000)
2010	Alain Souchon est chanteur	Virgin	13	15	–	
2016	Le concert (jointly with Laurent Voulzy)	Columbia	15	–	–	
2022	Ici & là - En concert au dôme de Paris	Parlophone	–	58	–	

- ^{A} Re-release

=== Compilations ===
Year	Album	Record label	FRA	BEL	SWI	Sales
1994	L'Intégral (5 CDs)	RCA	–	–	–	
1997	20 Chansons (Also known as 20 Sur 20)	BMG	–	–	–	France: Platinum (300,000)
2001	Collection (1974–1984)	RCA	–	30	10	France: Platinum (300,000)
2001	Collection (1985–2001)	Virgin	–	–	–	France: Platinum (300,000)
2002	Par les Sentiments (2 CDs)	Virgin	–	–	–	
2004	Platinum Collection	Virgin	–	13	–	
2007	100 Chansons (5 CDs)	EMI France	–	–	–	

=== Singles ===
Year	Single	FRA	BEL	Certification	Album
1986	"La Ballade de Jim"	24	-		C'est comme vous voulez
1989	"Quand je serai k.o.	29	-		Ultra moderne solitude
1993	"Foule sentimentale"	1	-	FR (SNEP): Silver (125,000)	C'est déjà ça
1994	"L'amour à la machine"	21	-		C'est déjà ça
2000	"Tailler la zone"	71	-		Au ras des pâquerettes
2001	"Le baiser / Caterpillar"	80	-		Au ras des pâquerettes
2002	"La vie ne vaut rien"	46	-		J'veux du live
2005	"Et si en plus y'a personne"	19	12		La vie Théodore
2006	"La vie Théodore"	68	-		La vie Théodore
2008	"Écoutez d'où ma peine vient"	-	7		Ecoutez d'où ma peine vient
2009	"Parachute doré"	-	39		
2011	"Les filles à quoi ça sert" (Bénabar / Cabrel / Goldman / Souchon)	-	3* (Ultratip)		
2011	"Le jour et la nuit"	-	2* (Ultratip)		
2014	"Derrière les mots" (with Laurent Voulzy)	35	22		
2014	"La baie des fourmis" (with Laurent Voulzy)	197	–		
2019	"Presque"	-	39		Âme fifties

*Did not appear in the official Belgian Ultratop 50 charts, but rather in the bubbling under Ultratip charts

== Awards ==
Victoires de la musique

- 1986: Music Video of the Year (La Ballade de Jim), directed by Philippe Bensoussan
- 1986: Song of the Year (Belle-Île-en-Mer)
- 1990: Song of the Year (Quand j'serai KO)
- 1991: Album of the Year (Nickel)
- 1994: Male Artist of the Year
- 1994: Song of the Year (Foule sentimentale)
- 1996: Album of the Year (Défoule sentimentale)

Globes de Cristal Award

- 2006 : Best Male Singer

Preceded by Alain Bashung	Victoires de la Musique; Male artist of the year 1994	Succeeded by MC Solaar
