= Comparison of SSH clients =

An SSH client is a software program which uses the secure shell protocol to connect to a remote computer. This article compares a selection of notable clients.

== General ==
Name	Developer	Initial release	Platform	Latest release		License	GUI	TUI/CLI
Name	Developer	Initial release	Platform	Version	Date	License	GUI	TUI/CLI
AbsoluteTelnet	Celestial Software (Brian Pence)	1996	Windows	13.14	2025-11-07	Proprietary	Yes	No
Bitvise SSH Client	Bitvise Limited	2001	Windows	9.47	2025-09-02	Proprietary	Yes	Yes
ConnectBot	Kenny Root; Jeffrey Sharkey	2007-11 (Note: Based on Trilead SSH-2 for Java.)	Android	1.9.10	2023-12-21	Apache-2.0	?	?
Dropbear	Matt Johnston	2003-04-06	AIX	2026.90	2026-05-03	MIT	No	Yes
Dropbear	Matt Johnston	2003-04-06	BSD	2026.90	2026-05-03	MIT	No	Yes
Dropbear	Matt Johnston	2003-04-06	Cygwin	2026.90	2026-05-03	MIT	No	Yes
Dropbear	Matt Johnston	2003-04-06	Linux	2026.90	2026-05-03	MIT	No	Yes
Dropbear	Matt Johnston	2003-04-06	HP-UX	2026.90	2026-05-03	MIT	No	Yes
Dropbear	Matt Johnston	2003-04-06	iOS	2026.90	2026-05-03	MIT	No	Yes
Dropbear	Matt Johnston	2003-04-06	Maemo	2026.90	2026-05-03	MIT	No	Yes
Dropbear	Matt Johnston	2003-04-06	macOS	2026.90	2026-05-03	MIT	No	Yes
Dropbear	Matt Johnston	2003-04-06	Solaris	2026.90	2026-05-03	MIT	No	Yes
OpenSSH (Note: Also known as OpenBSD Secure Shell.)	The OpenBSD project	1999-12-01 (Note: Based on OSSH.)	AIX	10.6	2026-10-06	BSD	No	Yes
OpenSSH	The OpenBSD project	1999-12-01	Android	10.6	2026-10-06	BSD	No	Yes
OpenSSH	The OpenBSD project	1999-12-01	BSD	10.6	2026-10-06	BSD	No	Yes
OpenSSH	The OpenBSD project	1999-12-01	Cygwin	10.6	2026-10-06	BSD	No	Yes
OpenSSH	The OpenBSD project	1999-12-01	Linux	10.6	2026-10-06	BSD	No	Yes
OpenSSH	The OpenBSD project	1999-12-01	HP-UX	10.6	2026-10-06	BSD	No	Yes
OpenSSH	The OpenBSD project	1999-12-01	iOS	10.6	2026-10-06	BSD	No	Yes
OpenSSH	The OpenBSD project	1999-12-01	Maemo	10.6	2026-10-06	BSD	No	Yes
OpenSSH	The OpenBSD project	1999-12-01	OpenVMS	10.6	2026-10-06	BSD	No	Yes
OpenSSH	The OpenBSD project	1999-12-01	macOS	10.6	2026-10-06	BSD	No	Yes
OpenSSH	The OpenBSD project	1999-12-01	Solaris	10.6	2026-10-06	BSD	No	Yes
OpenSSH	The OpenBSD project	1999-12-01	Windows	10.6	2026-10-06	BSD	No	Yes
OpenSSH	The OpenBSD project	1999-12-01	z/OS	10.6	2026-10-06	BSD	No	Yes
PuTTY	Simon Tatham	1999-01-22	BSD	0.85	2026-08-16	MIT	Yes	Yes
PuTTY	Simon Tatham	1999-01-22	Linux	0.85	2026-08-16	MIT	Yes	Yes
PuTTY	Simon Tatham	1999-01-22	macOS	0.85	2026-08-16	MIT	Yes	Yes
PuTTY	Simon Tatham	1999-01-22	Solaris	0.85	2026-08-16	MIT	Yes	Yes
PuTTY	Simon Tatham	1999-01-22	Windows	0.85	2026-08-16	MIT	Yes	Yes
SecureCRT	VanDyke Software	1998–06	Linux	9.6.4	2025-09-16	Proprietary	Yes	No
SecureCRT	VanDyke Software	1998–06	macOS	9.6.4	2025-09-16	Proprietary	Yes	No
SecureCRT	VanDyke Software	1998–06	iOS	4.0.0	2025-10-21	Proprietary	Yes	No
SecureCRT	VanDyke Software	1998–06	Windows	9.6.4	2025-09-16	Proprietary	Yes	No
Tera Term	TeraTerm Project	2004 (Note: Based on Tera Term Pro 2.3 (1994–1998).)	Windows	5.7.1	2026-10-09	BSD-3-Clause	Yes	No
TN3270 Plus	SDI USA, Inc.	2006	Windows	4.0.8	2025-07	Proprietary	Yes	No
WinSCP	Martin Přikryl	2000	Windows	6.3.3	2024-04-16	GNU GPL	Yes	?
wolfSSH	wolfSSL	2016-07-20 (Note: Based on wolfCrypt.)	BSD	1.6.0	2026-10-06	GPL-3.0-or-later (Note: Also available under a proprietary license.)	No	Yes
wolfSSH	wolfSSL	2016-07-20	Cygwin	1.6.0	2026-10-06	GPL-3.0-or-later	No	Yes
wolfSSH	wolfSSL	2016-07-20	Linux	1.6.0	2026-10-06	GPL-3.0-or-later	No	Yes
wolfSSH	wolfSSL	2016-07-20	macOS	1.6.0	2026-10-06	GPL-3.0-or-later	No	Yes
wolfSSH	wolfSSL	2016-07-20	Solaris	1.6.0	2026-10-06	GPL-3.0-or-later	No	Yes
wolfSSH	wolfSSL	2016-07-20	Windows	1.6.0	2026-10-06	GPL-3.0-or-later	No	Yes
ZOC Terminal	EmTec, Innovative Software	1995-07-01	macOS	9.04.2	2026-09-02	Proprietary	Yes	Yes
ZOC Terminal	EmTec, Innovative Software	1995-07-01	OS/2	4.15	2004-08-26	Proprietary	Yes	Yes
ZOC Terminal	EmTec, Innovative Software	1995-07-01	Windows	9.04.2	2026-09-02	Proprietary	Yes	Yes

== Platform ==
The operating systems or virtual machines the SSH clients are designed to run on without emulation include several possibilities:

- Partial indicates that while it works, the client lacks important functionality compared to versions for other OSs but may still be under development.

The list is not exhaustive, but rather reflects the most common platforms today.

Name	macOS	Windows	Cygwin	BSD	Linux	Solaris	OpenVMS	z/OS	AIX	HP-UX	iOS	Android	Maemo	Windows Phone
AbsoluteTelnet	No	Yes	No	No	No	No	No	No	No	No	No	No	No	?
Bitvise SSH Client	No	Yes	No	No	No	No	No	No	No	No	No	No	No	No
ConnectBot	No	No	No	No	No	No	No	No	No	No	No	Yes	No	No
Dropbear	Yes	No	Yes	Yes	Yes	Yes	?	?	Yes	Yes	Yes (Note: Only for jailbroken devices.)	No	Yes	?
lsh	Yes	No	No	Partial (Note: lsh supports only one BSD platform officially, FreeBSD.)	Yes	Yes	?	?	No	No	No	No	No	?
OpenSSH (Note: Also known as OpenBSD Secure Shell.)	Included	Included (Note: Included and enabled by default since windows 10 version 1803. Win32-OpenSSH can be installed as an optional component in the Windows versions before Windows 10 version 1803 to Windows 10 version 1709. Portable version can be download from Win32-OpenSSH for other versions.)	Included	Included	Included (Note: The majority of Linux distributions have OpenSSH as an official package, but a few do not.)	Yes	Yes	Yes	Yes	Yes	Yes	Yes	Yes	?
PuTTY	Partial	Yes	?	Yes	Yes	Yes	?	?	No	No	No	No	No	Beta
SecureCRT	Yes	Yes	No	No	Yes	No	No	No	No	No	Yes	No	No	?
SmartFTP	No	Yes	No	No	No	No	No	No	No	No	No	No	No	?
Tera Term	No	Yes	No	No	No	No	No	No	No	No	No	No	No	?
TN3270 Plus	No	Yes	No	No	No	No	No	No	No	No	No	No	No	?
WinSCP	No	Yes	No	No	No	No	No	No	No	No	Yes	No	No	?
wolfSSH	Yes	Yes	Yes	Yes	Yes	Yes	No	No	No	No	No	No	No	No
ZOC Terminal	Yes	Yes	No	No	No	No	No	No	No	No	No	No	No	?
Name	macOS	Windows	Cygwin	BSD	Linux	Solaris	OpenVMS	z/OS	AIX	HP-UX	iOS	Android	Maemo	Windows Phone

== Technical ==
Name	SSH1 (insecure)	SSH2	Additional protocols		Port forwarding and Tunneling			Session multiplexing (Note: Accelerating OpenSSH connections with ControlMaster.)	Kerberos	IPv6	Terminal	SFTP/SCP	Proxy client (Note: Can the SSH client connect itself through a proxy? This is distinct from offering a SOCKS proxy or port forwarding.)
Name	SSH1 (insecure)	SSH2	TELNET	rlogin	Port forwarding	SOCKS (Note: The ability for the SSH client to perform dynamic port forwarding by acting as a local SOCKS proxy.)	VPN (Note: The ability for the SSH client to establish a VPN, e.g. using TUN/TAP.)	Session multiplexing	Kerberos	IPv6	Terminal	SFTP/SCP	Proxy client
AbsoluteTelnet	Yes	Yes	Yes	No	Yes	Yes	No	Yes	Yes	Yes	Yes	Yes	SOCKS 4, 5; HTTP
Bitvise SSH Client	No	Yes	No	No	Yes	Yes	Yes	Yes	Yes	Yes	Yes	Yes	SOCKS 4, 5
Dropbear	No	Yes	No	No	Yes	No	No	No	No	Yes	Yes	Yes	?
lsh	No	Yes	Yes	No	Yes	Yes	No	Yes	No	Yes	Yes	Yes	?
OpenSSH (Note: Also known as OpenBSD Secure Shell.)	No (Note: OpenSSH deleted SSH protocol version 1 support in version 7.6 (2017-10-03))	Yes	No	No	Yes	Yes	Yes	Yes	Yes	Yes	Yes	Yes	ProxyCommand
PuTTY	Yes	Yes	Yes	Yes	Yes	Yes	No	Yes	Yes (Note: The version 0.63 supports GSSAPI. Successfully tested on Win 8 using Active Directory)	Yes	Yes	Yes (Note: The PuTTY developers provide SCP and SFTP functionality as binaries for separate download.)	SOCKS 4, 5; HTTP; Telnet; Local
SecureCRT	Yes	Yes	Yes	Yes	Yes	Yes	No	Yes	Yes	Yes	Yes	Yes	SOCKS 4, 5; HTTP; Telnet; Generic
SmartFTP	No	Yes	Yes	No	No	No	No	No	Yes	Yes	Yes	Yes	SOCKS 4, 5; HTTP
Tera Term	Yes	Yes	Yes	No	Yes	No	No	No	No	Yes	Yes	SCP	SOCKS 4, 5; HTTP; Telnet
TN3270 Plus	Yes	Yes	Yes	No	No	Yes	No	Yes	No	Yes	Yes	No	SOCKS 4
WinSCP (Note: WinSCP bundles a number of software components including PuTTY. .)	No (Note: WinSCP Version history.)	Yes	No	No	limited (Note: WinSCP connection tunneling.)	No	No	No	Yes	Yes	simple	Yes	SOCKS 4, 5; HTTP; Telnet; Local
wolfSSH	No	Yes	No	No	Yes	No	No	No	No	Yes	simple	Yes	No
ZOC Terminal	Yes	Yes	Yes	Yes	Yes	Yes	No	No	Yes	Yes	Yes	Yes (Note: SCP and SFTP through terminal.) (Note: SCP and SFTP according to ZOC features page.)	SOCKS 4; 5; HTTP; Jumpserver
Name	SSH1 (insecure)	SSH2	Additional protocols		Tunneling			Session multiplexing	Kerberos	IPv6	Terminal	SFTP/SCP	Proxy client
Name	SSH1 (insecure)	SSH2	TELNET	rlogin	Port forwarding	SOCKS	VPN	Session multiplexing	Kerberos	IPv6	Terminal	SFTP/SCP	Proxy client

== Features ==
Name	Keyboard mapping	Session tabs	ZMODEM transfers	Find text in buffer	Mouse input support (Note: The ability to transmit mouse input to text mode applications such as Midnight Commander)	Unicode support	URL hyperlinking	Public key authentication	Smart card support	Hardware encryption	FIPS 140-2 validation	Scripting	Shared Database	Auto-reconnect	CA Certificates
AbsoluteTelnet	full	Yes	Yes	Yes	Yes	Yes	Yes	Yes	Yes	Yes (Note: AbsoluteTelnet/SSH supports hardware-backed Secure Keys via FIDO2/WebAuthn (ed25519-sk and ecdsa-sk) beginning with Version 13.14.)	Yes	Yes	?	?	?
Bitvise SSH Client	?	No	No	No	Yes	Yes	No	Yes	No	?	Partial	Yes	No	Yes	No
OpenSSH (Note: Also known as OpenBSD Secure Shell.)	?	No	No	?	Yes (Note: Only when the terminal itself supports mouse input. Most graphical ones do, e.g. xterm.)	Yes	not native (Note: No native URL highlighting; however most graphical consoles support URL highlighting.)	Yes	Yes	Yes	Partial (Note: Validated when running OpenSSH 2.1 on Red Hat Enterprise Linux 6.2 in FIPS mode or when running OpenSSH 1.1 on Red Hat Enterprise Linux 5 in FIPS mode)	No	No	?	Yes (Note: OpenSSH supports the minimal certificate format since v5.4. "OpenSSH Release Notes: 5.4". OpenBSD Project. 2010-03-08.)
PuTTY	No	No (Note: PuTTY does not support tabs directly, but many wrappers are available that do.)	No	No	Yes	Yes	No (Note: PuTTY does not support hyperlinks, but some forks of PuTTY do.)	Yes	No	Yes	No	No	No	No	Yes (Note: PuTTY has supported OpenSSH certificates since version 0.78, released in 2022.)
SecureCRT	Yes	Yes	Yes	Yes	Yes	Yes	Yes	Yes	Yes	No	Yes	Yes	No	?	?
SmartFTP	Partial	Yes	No	Yes	Yes	Yes	Yes	Yes	Yes	AES-NI	Yes	No	?	?	?
Tera Term	Yes	Yes	Yes	No	Yes	Yes	Yes	Yes	No	No	No	Yes	No	?	?
TN3270 Plus	Yes	Yes	No	No	No	No	Yes	Yes	No	No	No	Yes	?	?	?
wolfSSH	No	No	No	No	No	Yes	No	Yes	No	Yes	Yes	No	No	No	Yes
ZOC Terminal	full	Yes	Yes	Yes	Yes	Yes	Yes	Yes	Yes	Yes (Note: ZOC supports FIDO/sk keys with Version 9, see Version history and FIDO2 Instructions.)	No	Yes	?	?	Yes (Note: ZOC supports OpenSSSH style CA Keys, see ZOC feature list (SSH features).)

== Authentication key algorithms ==
This table lists standard authentication key algorithms implemented by SSH clients. Some SSH implementations include both server and client implementations and support custom non-standard authentication algorithms not listed in this table.

Name	ssh-dss (Note: ssh-dss is based on Digital Signature Algorithm which is sensitive to entropy, secrecy, and uniqueness of its random signature value.)	ssh-rsa	RSA with SHA-2		ECDSA with SHA-2			EdDSA		Security keys	
Name	ssh-dss	ssh-rsa	rsa-sha2-256	rsa-sha2-512	ecdsa-sha2-nistp256	ecdsa-sha2-nistp384	ecdsa-sha2-nistp521	ssh-ed25519	ssh-ed448	sk-ecdsa-sha2-nistp256	sk-ssh-ed25519
AbsoluteTelnet	Yes	Yes	Yes	Yes	Yes	Yes	Yes	Yes	No	Yes	Yes
Bitvise SSH Client	?	?	?	?	?	?	?	?	?		
Dropbear	Yes	Yes	Yes	No	Yes	Yes	Yes	Yes	?		
lsh	?	?	?	?	?	?	?	?	?		
OpenSSH (Note: Also known as OpenBSD Secure Shell.)	Yes (Note: By default, disabled at run-time since OpenSSH 7.0 released in 2015.)	Yes	Yes	Yes	Yes	Yes	Yes	Yes	No	Yes	Yes
PuTTY	Yes	Yes	Yes	Yes	Yes	Yes	Yes	Yes	Yes	No (Note: PuTTY does not support security keys / FIDO tokens, but is supported in PuTTY-CAC)	No
SecureCRT	Yes	Yes	Yes	Yes	Yes	Yes	Yes	Yes	?		
SmartFTP	Yes	Yes	Yes	Yes	Yes	Yes	Yes	Yes	No	No	No
Tera Term	?	?	?	?	?	?	?	?	?		
TN3270 Plus	?	?	?	?	?	?	?	?	?		
WinSCP	No	Yes	Yes	Yes	Yes	Yes	Yes	?	?		
wolfSSH	No	Yes	Yes	Yes	Yes	Yes	Yes	No	No	No	No
ZOC Terminal (Note: ZOC' SSH is based on OpenSSH and supports the same encryptions.)	Yes	Yes	Yes	Yes	Yes	Yes	Yes	Yes	No	Yes (Note: ZOC supports FIDO/sk keys with Version 9, see Version history and FIDO2 Instructions.)	Yes

== See also ==
- Comparison of SSH servers
- Comparison of remote desktop software
