= Sysax Multi Server =

FTP and SSH server for Windows

- Developers: Codeorigin, LLC
- Stable release: 5.67 / Aug 10, 2012
- Operating system: Windows
- Type: FTP server, Secure Shell
- Website: www.sysax.com/server/

Sysax Multi Server is a Secure FTP Server and a SSH2 Secure Shell Server for the Windows operating system. Web browser-based secure HTTPS file transfers and Telnet access is also supported. The software is certified for Windows Vista, and tested to be compatible with Windows 7/8. The software is also certified for Windows Server 2012 and runs on all 32 and 64 bit editions of Windows including Windows Server 2008. The Personal edition of the software which includes SSH2/SFTP support is free for non-commercial use.

== Features ==
- Protocols supported include FTP, FTPS, SFTP, HTTP, HTTPS, Telnet, and Secure Shell
- Authentication mechanisms include Windows/LDAP Active Directory, ODBC, and local server accounts
- Remote web browser based administration
- Encryption with SSL/TLS (for FTPS) and SSH2 (for SFTP)
- Supports file resuming for both uploads and downloads
- Server triggers and scripting for events such as failed login and file upload or download
- File integrity verification using CRC32, MD5, and SHA1
- Support for automatic IP blocking for failed logins
- Support for High Availability/Failover and Windows Clustering
- Runs as a Windows Service
- Certified for Windows Vista
- Compatible with Windows Server 2008, Windows 7, and Windows 8
- Certified for Windows Server 2012
