= Bitvise =

Proprietary secure remote access software developed for Windows

- Developer: Bitvise Limited
- Stable release: 9.47 / 2 September 2025
- Operating system: Windows
- Standard: RFC 4250, RFC 4251, RFC 4252, RFC 4253, RFC 4254, RFC 4256, RFC 4419, RFC 4462, RFC 4716, RFC 4819, RFC 5656, RFC 6668, RFC 8308, RFC 8332
- License: Proprietary
- Website: www.bitvise.com

Bitvise is a proprietary secure remote access software developed for Windows and available as a client and server. The software is based on the Secure Shell (SSH) protocol, which provides a secure channel over an insecure network in a client-server architecture.

== Technology ==
Bitvise software implements version 2 of the Secure Shell (SSH) protocol, SFTP versions 3, 4, and 6, as well as SCP and FTPS according to publicly available standards.

== Development ==
The software is developed and published by Bitvise Limited. The first released product was Bitvise SSH Server, then named WinSSHD, in 2001, and it was shortly followed by Tunnelier, now Bitvise SSH Client. There have been 8 major releases of the software so far.

== Features ==
Both the server and client work with all desktop and server versions of Windows and allow for remote-based access using a tool like WinVNC. They provide a GUI as well as command-line interface to support SFTP, SSH, SCP, and VPN using the TCP/IP tunneling feature.

The software among other supports GSSAPI-enabled Kerberos 5 exchange and NTLM Kerberos 5 user authentication. It provides two-factor authentication and compatibility with RFC 6238 authenticator apps.

== Controversies ==
Bitvise owns and manages the domain putty.org which references to PuTTY, another SSH client for Windows. For many years, it linked to the official PuTTY distribution page along with promoting Bitvise's products. However, in July 2025 after being asked about this, Bitvise replied by posting the full email conversation, ignoring the anonymisation requests with a "Lol You fucking idiot." reply. After that, the putty.org website changed its contents to promote anti-vaccine theories.

== See also ==
- Comparison of SSH clients
- Comparison of SSH servers
