= CompleteFTP =

FTP and SFTP server for Windows

- Developer: EnterpriseDT
- Initial release: November 13, 2007; 18 years ago
- Stable release: 23.1.0 / December 29, 2023; 2 years ago
- Operating system: Windows
- Type: FTP server
- License: Proprietary, Trialware
- Website: www.enterprisedt.com/products/completeftp

CompleteFTP is a proprietary FTP and SFTP server for Windows that supports FTP, FTPS, SFTP, SCP, HTTP and HTTPS.

== History ==
CompleteFTP began as edtFTPD, which was released in 2004. It was a repackaged version of ProFTPD (Cygwin version) with a graphical front-end running on the .NET Framework.

In November 2007, the name was changed to CompleteFTP (version 0.5) and the back-end was replaced by a proprietary FTP/FTPS engine. The original edtFTPD administrator GUI was retained in this version. This version was also free.

CompleteFTP version 1.0 was released in October 2008 under a commercial license. It introduced a new GUI as well as an improved back-end. CompleteFTP version 2.0 was released in February 2009, with SFTP support. Subsequent releases have added support for SCP, HTTP and HTTPS.

CompleteFTP is now at version 23.1.0 - released in December 2023.

There are four editions of CompleteFTP:

CompleteFTP Enterprise MFT. Features include Professional Edition features plus multiple sites, clustering, multi-protocol gateway, customization, automatic uploads to CompleteFTP servers, and a file sharing client.
CompleteFTP Professional. Features include Standard Edition features plus Active Directory users, SCP and HTTP/HTTPS, email and process events, and a file sharing client.
CompleteFTP Standard. Features include Free Edition features plus SFTP, Windows users, auto-banning, remote administration.
CompleteFTP Free. Features include FTP and FTPS, virtual file-system, unlimited users.
