= ZOC (software) =

- Developers: EmTec, Innovative Software
- Release: October 12, 1993; 33 years ago
Stable release
- Windows: 9.04.4 / 28 October 2026
- macOS: 9.04.4 / 28 October 2026
- OS/2: 4.15 / 26 August 2004
- Operating system: Microsoft Windows, macOS
- Type: Terminal emulator
- License: Proprietary
- Website: www.emtec.com/zoc/

ZOC is a popular computer-based terminal emulator and Telnet software client for the Microsoft Windows and Apple Macintosh macOS operating systems that supports telnet, modem, SSH 1 and 2, ISDN, serial, TAPI, Rlogin and other means of communication. Its terminal emulator supports Xterm emulation with full colors, meta-keys and local printing, VT102, VT220 and several types of ANSI as well as Wyse, TVI, TN3270, and Sun's CDE. It supports full keyboard remapping, scripting in REXX and other languages, and support for named pipes.

ZOC is commercial software developed by Markus Schmidt of EmTec Innovative Software in Germany, a firm which produces software for various aspects of communications via telephone, PC, ISDN and the like. Price as of 2024 is about US$80, with a free evaluation period of 30 days. ZOC can be downloaded for evaluation from EmTec or several shareware distribution sites. EmTec produces another associated but independent telecommunications programme for use over TCP/IP, an FTP package including client and server, and PyroBatchFTP, a programmable FTP tool.

== History ==
ZOC was first released for OS/2 in October 1993 (v0.95) and for Windows in November 1996 (v3.02). In 1997 it was selected as runner-up in the OS/2 e-Zine! Readers' Choice Awards. ZOC released version 3.11 in January 1999. Support for OS/2 was discontinued with the release of version 5. Mac OS X has been supported from version 6.

== Features ==
The following list describes supported communication methods, emulated terminals and other features.

=== Protocols ===
- Secure Shell (SSH V1/V2) based on OpenSSH 8.1 with public/private key authentication, port forwarding (tunneling) and Smart Card support.
- Telnet (RFC-Telnet, pure TCP sockets, SSL-Telnet)
- Modem and serial console via serial port and TAPI (Windows modem)
- File transfer protocols: ASCII, X-Modem, Y-Modem, Z-Modem, Kermit, SCP, and SFTP

=== Terminals emulated ===
- Linux (Xterm) console-like
- VT52, VT100, VT102, VT220, VT420, VT520
- ANSI-BBS, ANSI-SCO, Avatar
- IBM like TN3270 and TN5250
- Sun-CDE
- QNX V4
- Wyse 30, 50, 60
- TVI 9xx (Televideo-920, TVI 925, TVI 950)
- Xterm
- HP2645

=== Automation ===
- Scripting
  - REXX language for scripting (basic REXX with about 75 extensions to control the terminal emulator)
  - AppleScript support with access to all internal script commands on macOS
  - recorded login scripts, macro commands, automatic replies on incoming text
- DDE supported in Windows version, allowing ZOC to act as a communication server

=== User interface ===
- Tabbed interface for multiple concurrent connections and overview display to show thumbnails of open sessions
- Keys for macros, remappable keyboard, user button bar

== See also ==
- Comparison of SSH clients
- List of terminal emulators
