= FileZilla =

Free and open source FTP software

FileZilla Client

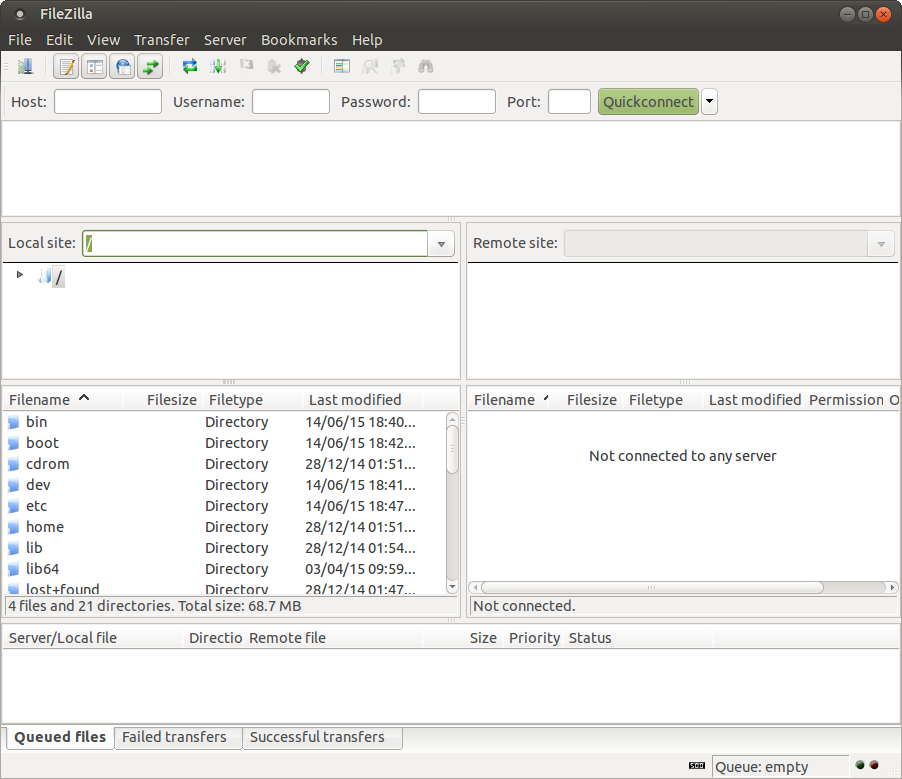
- FileZilla 3.7.3 running under Ubuntu MATE
- Developer: Tim Kosse
- Release: 22 June 2001; 25 years ago
- Stable release: 3.71.1 / 26 August 2026
- Written in: C++, wxWidgets
- Operating system: Cross-platform
- Size: 7.3 MB
- Available in: Multilingual
- Type: FTP client
- License: GPL-3.0-or-later
- Website: filezilla-project.org
- Repository: svn.filezilla-project.org/svn/FileZilla3/

FileZilla is a free and open-source, cross-platform FTP application, consisting of FileZilla Client and FileZilla Server. Clients are available for Windows, Linux, and macOS. Both server and client support FTP and FTPS (FTP over SSL/TLS), while the client can in addition connect to SFTP servers. FileZilla's source code is hosted on SourceForge. Professional editions of both the client and server offer additional features.

== History ==
FileZilla was started as a computer science class project in the second week of January 2001 by Tim Kosse and two classmates.

Before they started to write the code, they discussed under which license they should release it. They decided to make FileZilla an open-source project because many FTP clients were already available, and they didn't think that they would sell a single copy if they made FileZilla commercial. Since its initial development in 2001, FileZilla has been released under the GNU General Public License (GPL). The FileZilla client is currently released under GPL-2.0-or-later, and the server package under AGPL-3.0-or-later.

FileZilla featured as SourceForge's Project of the Month in November 2003.

With the release of version 3.70.0 on 9 April 2026, FileZilla switched from GPL v2 to GPL v3.

== Features ==
FileZilla Client allows file transfer using both FTP and encrypted FTP such as FTPS (server and client) and SFTP, with support for IPv6. One of its most notable features is its capability to pause and resume file transfer processes, even for files larger than 4 GB. Users can choose to overwrite existing files based on the age or size of the file. It also allows the preservation of timestamps on transferred files, provided there is support from the local system when downloading or from the target server when uploading.

FileZilla Client uses a tabbed user interface for multitasking, allowing users to browse more than one server or transfer files simultaneously between multiple servers. It also features a Site Manager to manage server lists and a transfer queue for ordering file transfer tasks. It has bookmarks for easy access and supports drag and drop for downloads and uploads. The software provides directory comparison for comparing local files and server files in the same directory. If there is a difference in the file details, such as a mismatch in name or size, the software will highlight the file in colour.

Other features include configurable transfer speed limits, filename filters, a network configuration wizard, remote file editing, keep-alive command to prevent disconnections when idle, HTTP/1.1, SOCKS5 and FTP-Proxy support, and logging events to a file for debugging. Additionally, users can export queues into an XML format file, browse directories synchronously, and remotely search for files on the server. The pro version of the client offers support for WebDAV and cloud storage solutions from major providers like Amazon, Google, and Microsoft. The Windows version has CLI support, and the macOS version has shell integration with Remote Drive.

FileZilla Client is a cross-platform software, runs on Windows, Linux, *BSD, and Mac OS X, and available in 47 languages worldwide, including Arabic, Armenian, Basque, Bulgarian, Catalan, Chinese, Corsican, Croatian, Czech, Danish, Dutch, German, Greek, Estonian, Finnish, French, Galician, Hebrew, Hungarian, Indonesian, Icelandic, Italian, Japanese, Georgian, Khmer, Korean, Kurdish, Kyrgyz, Lithuanian, Latvian, Macedonian, Norwegian, Nepali, Occitan, Persian, Polish, Portuguese, Romanian, Russian, Serbian, Slovak, Slovenian, Spanish, Thai, Turkish, Ukrainian, and Vietnamese.

These are some features of FileZilla Server:

- FTP and FTP over TLS (FTPS)
- IPv6 support
- Speed limits
- Large file support >4 GB
- Remote administration
- Permissions system with users and groups
- IP filters

The Pro version of the server offers 2FA support.

== Reception ==
In May 2008, Chris Foresman assessed FTP clients for Ars Technica, saying of FileZilla: "Some friends in the tech support world often recommend the free and open-source FileZilla, which offers a Mac OS X version in addition to Windows and Linux. But I've never been thrilled about its busy interface, which can be daunting for novice users."

Writing for Ars Technica in August 2008 Emil Protalinski said: "this week's free, third-party application recommendation is FileZilla.... This FTP client is very quick and is regularly updated. It may not have a beautiful GUI, but it certainly is fast and has never let me down."

GoDaddy, Clarion University of Pennsylvania and National Capital FreeNet recommend FileZilla for uploading files to their web hosting services.

FileZilla is available in the repositories of many Linux distributions, including Debian, Ubuntu, Trisquel and Parabola GNU/Linux-libre.

In January 2012, CNET gave FileZilla their highest rating of "spectacular"—five out of five stars.

As of 2022 FileZilla is regularly listed in articles on the top free software applications.

Since the project's participation in SourceForge's program to create revenue by adware, several reviewers started warning about downloading FileZilla and discouraged users from using it.

== Criticism ==
=== Bundled adware issues ===
In 2013 the project's hosting site, SourceForge.net, provided the main download of FileZilla with a download wrapper, "offering" additional software for the user to install. Numerous users reported that some of the adware installed without consent, despite declining all install requests, or used deception to obtain the user's "acceptance" to install. Among the reported effects are: web browser being hijacked, with content, start page and search engines being forcibly changed; popup windows; privacy or spying issues; and sudden shutdown and restart events possibly leading to loss of current work. Some of the adware was reported to resist removal or restoration of previous settings, or were said to reinstall after a supposed removal. Also, users reported adware programs to download and install more unwanted software, some causing alerts by security suites, for being malware.

The FileZilla webpage offers additional download options without adware installs, but the link to the adware download appears as the primary link, highlighted and marked as "recommended".

As of 2016, FileZilla displays ads (called sponsored updates) when starting the application. These ads appear as part of the "Check for updates" dialog.

In 2018, a further controversy about FileZilla's use of a bundled adware installer caused concern.

=== Plain text password storage ===
Until version 3.26 FileZilla stored all saved usernames and passwords as plain text, allowing any malware that had gained even limited access to the user's system to read the data. FileZilla author Tim Kosse was reluctant to add encrypted storage. He stated that it gives a false sense of security, since well-crafted malware can include a keylogger that reads the master password used to secure the data. Users have argued that reading the master password to decrypt the encrypted storage is still harder than just reading the unencrypted storage. A fork called FileZilla Secure was started in November 2016 to add encrypted storage. In May 2017, encrypted storage was also added to the main version, 10 years after it was first requested. Kosse maintained that the feature did not really increase security, as long as the operating system is not secure.

== FileZilla Server ==
FileZilla Server

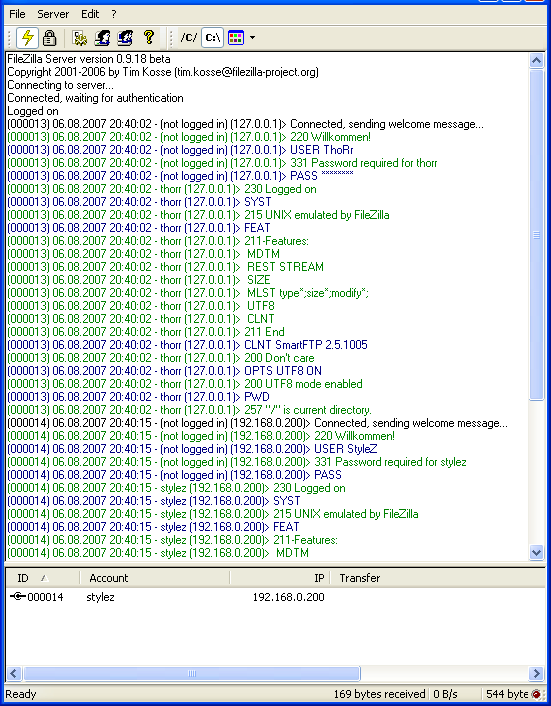
- FileZilla Server main interface
- Developers: Tim Kosse, et al.
- Release: 13 July 2008; 18 years ago
- Stable release: 1.12.6 / 5 May 2026
- Written in: C++
- Operating system: Linux, MacOS, Windows
- Type: FTP server
- License: 2021 (Note: AGPL-3.0-or-later since 2021, version 1.0.0.): AGPL-3.0-or-later; 2001 (Note: GPL-2.0-or-later from 2001 until 2021.): GPL-2.0-or-later
- Website: filezilla-project.org
- Repository: svn.filezilla-project.org/svn/FileZilla3/

FileZilla Server is a sister product to FileZilla Client. It is an FTP server supported by the same project and features support for FTP and FTP over SSL/TLS. FileZilla Server is currently available for Linux, macOS and Windows platforms.

FileZilla Server is a free, open-source FTP server. Its source code is hosted on the FileZilla Project website.

=== Features ===
FileZilla Server supports FTP and FTPS (FTP over SSL/TLS). Other features include:

- Encryption with SSL/TLS (for FTPS)
- Per-user permissions on the underlying file system
- GUI configuration tool
- Speed limits
- IP filtering

== FileZilla Client issues ==
Unlike some other FTP clients, FileZilla Client does not implement a workaround for an error in the IIS server which causes file corruption when resuming large file downloads.

== Operating system support ==
FileZilla Client

Operating system		Latest version	Release year
Windows	Windows 7 or later	Current (x64)	2023
Windows	Windows 7 or later	Current (IA-32)	2023
Windows	Windows Vista	3.25.1 (x64)	2017
Windows	Windows Vista	3.25.1 (IA-32)	2017
Windows	Windows XP	3.8.0	2014
Windows	Windows 2000	3.0.11.1	2008
Windows	Windows 9x	2.2.22	2006
macOS	10.13 or later	Current (ARM64)	2023
macOS	10.13 or later	Current (x64)	2023
macOS	10.11-10.12	3.58.0	2022
macOS	10.9-10.10	3.42.1	2019
macOS	10.7-10.8	3.24.1	2017
macOS	10.6	3.8.1	2014
macOS	10.5	3.8.1 (Intel)	2014
macOS	10.5	3.8.0 (PPC)	2014
macOS	10.4	3.0.6 (Intel)	2008
macOS	10.4	3.0.6 (PPC)	2008
Linux		Current (x64)	2023
Linux		Current (IA-32)	2023

== See also ==
- WinSCP
