= SmartFTP =

File transfer program for Windows

- Developer: SmartSoft Ltd.
- Stable release: 10.0 Build 3248 / November 6, 2024; 16 months ago
- Operating system: Windows 10 and later
- Platform: x86-64
- Available in: 25 languages
- List of languages English, Arabic, Bulgarian, Catalan, Chinese (simplified), Chinese (traditional), Croatian, Czech, Dutch, French, German, Hungarian, Italian, Japanese, Korean, Norwegian, Portuguese, Russian, Slovak, Spanish, Swedish, Thai, Turkish, Ukrainian, Vietnamese
- Type: FTP client
- License: Trialware
- Website: www.smartftp.com

SmartFTP is a network file transfer program for Microsoft Windows that supports file transfer via FTP, FTPS, SFTP, WebDAV, Amazon S3, Google Drive, Microsoft OneDrive, Box, Google Cloud Storage and Backblaze B2 protocols. It supports SSL/TLS, IPv6 and FXP, and features a transfer queue, proxy and firewall support, multiple connections, chmod features and drag-and-drop. The software uses the Windows API for its interface. It is available for both IA-32 and x64 editions of Windows.

Prior to July 2008, the program was free to home or non-profit users.

== Editions ==
SmartFTP is available in three editions:

=== Professional ===
- FTP, FTPS
- SFTP over SSH
- WebDAV
- Text Editor

=== Ultimate ===
- All features of the Professional Edition
- Google Drive
- OneDrive support
- Terminal client

=== Enterprise ===
- All features of the Ultimate Edition
- Amazon S3
- Google Cloud Storage
- Backblaze B2
- Box
- Task scheduler
