= Secure file transfer program =

Secure file-transfer software

sftp
- Developer: The OpenBSD Project
- Written in: C
- Operating system: Unix, Unix-like, Microsoft Windows
- Type: Command
- License: BSD, ISC, public domain
- Website: www.openssh.com
- Repository: github.com/openssh/openssh-portable/

sftp is a command-line interface client program to transfer files using the SSH File Transfer Protocol (SFTP), which runs inside the encrypted Secure Shell connection.

It provides an interactive interface similar to that of traditional command-line FTP clients.

One common implementation of sftp is part of the OpenSSH project. There are other command-line SFTP clients that use different names, such as lftp, PSFTP and PSCP (from PuTTY package) and WinSCP.

== See also ==
- Comparison of SSH servers
- Comparison of SSH clients
