= FTP Voyager =

- FTP Voyager 16
- Developers: SolarWinds (aka Rhino Software, Inc)
- Stable release: 16.2.0.328 / October 1, 2014; 11 years ago
- Operating system: Windows
- Type: FTP Client
- License: Proprietary software
- Website: www.FTPVoyager.com

FTP Voyager is an FTP/FTPS/SFTP client for Microsoft Windows with support for the following features:

- FTP/FTPS/SFTP protocols
- Directory synchronization
- Use of multiple file transfer threads
- File searching
- Custom FTP commands
- File transfer queueing with up to 9 transfer threads
- Proxy server support
- Customizable ribbon interface
- Automatic name conversion during transfers
- "Live" file editing
- ZLIB compression
- Multiple concurrent local/remote browsers
- Native IPv6 support
- Native 64-bit system support

== FTP Voyager Scheduler ==
FTP Voyager includes a component called FTP Voyager Scheduler which allows for various actions to be scheduled:

- Uploads
- Downloads
- Synchronizations (Local/Remote)
- File move operations (move up, move down)
- External batch operations

== History ==
FTP Voyager began as an ActiveX project by Mark Peterson known as "FTPTree". Originally intended to work as an in-browser FTP client, it developed into an independent graphical application to fill the need to be able to use FTP as easily as Windows Explorer. It was first released in January 1997, and quickly took on the appearance of the Windows 95 Windows Explorer. Ongoing development has added features like synchronization, customizable UI, FTP Voyager Scheduler, thumbnail support and more.

In 2012, FTP Voyager released version 16, which added IPv6 support, 64-bit support, and more. The new release incorporated a redesign of the transfer engine that also massively improved transfer performance, and enables it to better support modern system hardware and utilize it with greater efficiency.

FTP Voyager was the winner of the Software Industry's "Best Internet Enhancement" award from 2000 to 2007 and again in 2010.

FTP Voyager v16 was released as a free product when SolarWinds purchased Rhinosoft on Dec. 18, 2012.
