= Virtual terminal =

Computer application for remote access

In open systems, a virtual terminal (VT) is an application service that:

1. Allows host terminals on a multi-user network to interact with other hosts regardless of terminal type and characteristics,
2. Allows remote log-on by local area network managers for the purpose of management,
3. Allows users to access information from another host processor for transaction processing,
4. Serves as a backup facility.

PuTTY is an example of a virtual terminal.

ITU-T defines a virtual terminal protocol based on the OSI application layer protocols. However, the virtual terminal protocol is not widely used on the Internet.

== ISO Standards ==
Virtual terminal services are defined under ISO 9040 and virtual terminal protocols are defined under ISO 9041.

== See also ==
- Pseudo terminal for the software interface that provides access to virtual terminals
- Secure Shell
- Telnet
- Terminal emulator for an application program that provides access to virtual terminals
- Virtual console for an analogous concept that provides several local consoles

== Sources ==
- This article incorporates public domain material from Federal Standard 1037C. General Services Administration. Archived from the original on 2022-01-22.
