= AbsoluteTelnet =

- Developer: Brian Pence
- Stable release: 13.13 / 21 October, 2025
- Operating system: Microsoft Windows
- Type: Terminal emulator
- License: Proprietary
- Website: www.celestialsoftware.net

AbsoluteTelnet is a software terminal client for Windows that implements Telnet, SSH 1 and 2, SFTP, TAPI Dialup and direct COM port connections. It is commercial software, originally released in 1999 and is still in regular development by Brian Pence of Celestial Software.

== Features ==
Some features of AbsoluteTelnet:

- Post quantum key exchange including mlkem768x25519-sha256 and sntrup761x25519-sha512
- Support for external authentication agents (pageant, openssh, 1Password, bitwarden)
- Emulates VT52, VT100, VT220, VT320, ANSI, Xterm, QNX, SCO-ANSI, ANSIBBS, and WYSE60
- Password, Public-key, keyboard-interactive, Smartcard and GSSAPI authentication support
- Support Triple DES, TWOFISH, BLOWFISH, AES, ARCFOUR, CAST128 ciphers in CBC or CTR mode as well as AEAD ciphers such as AES/GCM
- Tabbed interface for multiple concurrent connections (Dockable)
- Scripting support using VBScript
- Unicode 5.0 support, including bidirectional text, surrogates, combining characters, etc.
- Passthru printing
- IPv6 support
- IDNA support
- Localized into 8 languages (English, German, French, Portuguese, Chinese, Russian, Norwegian and Hungarian)
- Pocket PC support
- XMODEM, YMODEM, and ZMODEM file transfer for all terminal connections
- SSH File Transfer Protocol for ssh2 connections only

== See also ==
- Comparison of SSH clients
