= WolfSSH =

SSH library in C language

wolfSSH
- Developer: John Safranek
- Initial release: July 20, 2016
- Stable release: 1.4.21 / 20 October 2025
- Written in: C language
- Operating system: Multi-platform
- Type: Security library
- License: GPL-3.0-or-later or proprietary license
- Website: www.wolfssl.com/products/wolfssh/
- Repository: github.com/wolfSSL/wolfssh

wolfSSH is a small, portable, embedded SSH library targeted for use by embedded systems developers. It is an open-source implementation of SSH written in the C language. It includes SSH client libraries and an SSH server implementation. It allows for password and public key authentication.

== Platforms ==
wolfSSH is currently available for Win32/64, Linux, macOS, Solaris, Threadx, VxWorks, FreeBSD, NetBSD, OpenBSD, embedded Linux, WinCE, Haiku, OpenWrt, iPhone (iOS), Android, Wii and GameCube through DevKitPro support, QNX, MontaVista, TRON variants (TRON/ITRON/μITRON), NonStop OS, OpenCL, Micrium's MicroC/OS-II, FreeRTOS, SafeRTOS, Freescale MQX, Nucleus, TinyOS, TI-RTOS, HP-UX, uTasker, embOS, PIC32, PikeOS, Green Hills INTEGRITY, and Zephyr.

== Protocols ==
The wolfSSH SSH library implements the SSHv2 protocol for both client and server. It also includes support for Secure Copy (SCP), SSH File Transfer Protocol (SFTP), remote command execution, and port forwarding. X509 certificate support RFC 6187.

== Algorithms ==
wolfSSH uses the cryptographic services provided by wolfCrypt. wolfCrypt Provides RSA, ECC, Diffie–Hellman, AES (CBC, GCM), Random Number Generation, Large Integer support, and base 16/64 encoding/decoding, and SHA-1, SHA-2, AES (GCM, CTR, CBC), X25519 and Ed25519, X448 and Ed448.

=== Key exchange ===
- diffie-hellman-group1-sha1
- diffie-hellman-group14-sha1
- diffie-hellman-group-exchange-sha256
- ecdh-sha2-nistp256
- ecdh-sha2-nistp384
- ecdh-sha2-nistp521
- diffie-hellman-group14-sha256
- curve25519-sha256

=== Public key ===
- ssh-rsa
- ecdsa-sha2-nistp256
- ecdsa-sha2-nistp384
- ecdsa-sha2-nistp521
- ssh-ed25519
- x509v3-ssh-rsa
- x509v3-ecdsa-sha2-nistp256
- x509v3-ecdsa-sha2-nistp384
- x509v3-ecdsa-sha2-nistp521

=== Integrity ===
- hmac-sha1
- hmac-sha1-96
- hmac-sha2-256

=== Encryption ===
- aes128-cbc
- aes192-cbc
- aes256-cbc
- aes128-ctr
- aes192-ctr
- aes256-ctr
- aes128-gcm (OpenSSH compatible)

=== Post-Quantum ===
- Supports hybrid post-quantum use with ML-KEM

== Licensing ==
wolfSSH is open source and dual licensed under both the GNU GPL-3.0-or-later and commercial licensing.

== See also ==
- Secure Shell
- OpenSSH
- DropBear
- Comparison of SSH clients
- Comparison of SSH servers
- Comparison of cryptography libraries
