= Simon Tatham =

English programmer

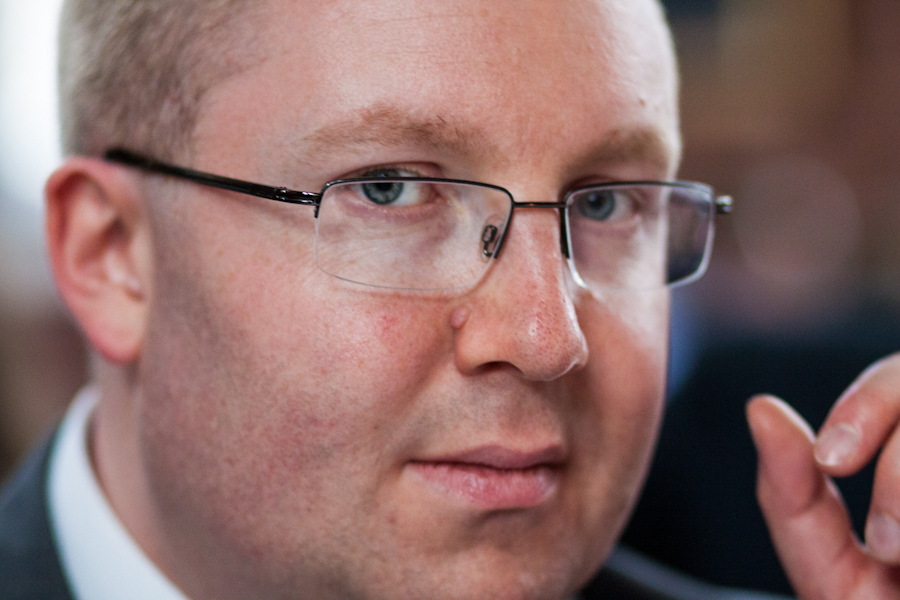
- Born: 3 May 1977 (age 49)
- Occupation: Computer programmer
- Employer: ARM Holdings
- Known for: PuTTY, NASM
- Website: www.chiark.greenend.org.uk/~sgtatham/

Simon Tatham (born 3 May 1977) is a British computer programmer. He created and maintains PuTTY, a free software implementation of Secure Shell (SSH) and Telnet for Microsoft Windows and Unix, along with an xterm terminal emulator. He is also the original author of Netwide Assembler (NASM), and maintains a collection of small computer programs which implement one-player puzzle games. All of them run natively on Nintendo DS, Symbian S60, Unix (GTK; Android, MacOS), and Windows.

He attended the University of Cambridge, and currently works at ARM Holdings.

== See also ==
- List of programmers
- List of computer scientists
