= Tera Term =

Open source software

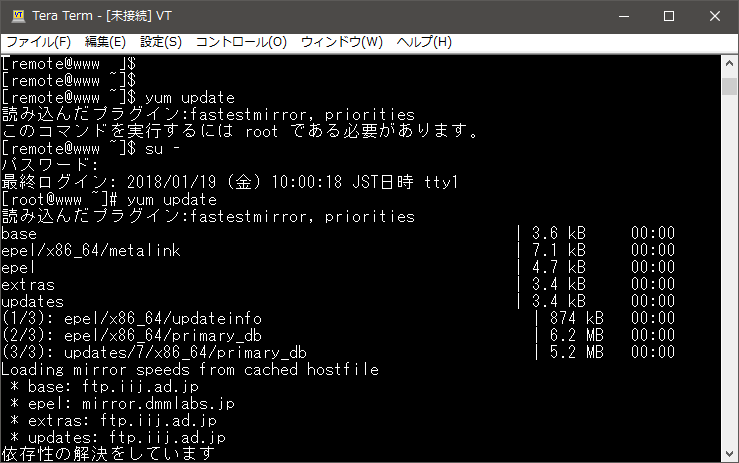
- Original author: Takashi Teranishi
- Developer: Tera Term Project
- Release: 1994; 32 years ago
- Stable release: 5.7.0 / 4 September 2026
- Written in: C and C++ (originally Pascal)
- Operating system: Microsoft Windows
- Type: Terminal emulator
- License: BSD-3-Clause
- Website: teratermproject.github.io/index-en.html
- Repository: github.com/TeraTermProject/teraterm

Tera Term (alternatively TeraTerm) is an open-source, free, software implemented, terminal emulator (communications) program. It emulates different types of computer terminals, from DEC VT100 to DEC VT382. It supports Telnet, SSH 1 & 2 and serial port connections. It also has a built-in macro scripting language (supporting Oniguruma regular expressions) and other plugins.

== History ==
The first versions of Tera Term were created by Takashi Teranishi from Japan. At the time, it was the only freely available terminal emulator to effectively support the Japanese language. Original development of Tera Term stopped in the late 1990s at version 2.3, but other organizations have created variations.

In October 2002, Ayera Technologies released TeraTerm Pro 3.1.3 supporting SSH2 and added multiple other features like a built-in web server for API integration with external systems, recurring "keep-alive" commands, and ODBC database support via the TT Macro Scripting Language. Ayera Technologies did not make their source open, but does provide limited technical support.

In 2004, Yutaka Hirata, a software designer from Japan, restarted development of the open source version of Tera Term. He added his own implementation of SSH2 and many new features on top of what was part of version 2.3.

To avoid confusion with version numbers and to indicate that Tera Term developed by Yutaka was more recent than version 3.1.3 from Ayera Technologies, it was decided to give this branch of Tera Term Professional version numbers starting 4.xx.

In January 2005, Boris Maisuradze, together with Yutaka Hirata, started the TeraTerm Support forum where they answered questions from Tera Term users. Posting in this forum was the best way to suggest new features for Tera Term or propose new commands for the Tera Term Macro language. For more than 10 years the forum was hosted on LogMeTT.com website maintained by Boris Maisuradze. Boris also developed several freeware tools that became part of TeraTerm package. Later Boris decided to retire from this project. LogMeTT.com website was shut down and support forums moved to TeraTerm Project site.

Since 2007, Tera Term has been maintained by Tera Term Project (Japanese Developer team) as open source software.

== Features ==
Tera Term supports:

- Serial port connections over UART
- TCP/IP (Telnet, SSH1, SSH2) connections
- Log replay
- Named pipe connection
- IPv6 communication
- VT100 emulation and selected VT200/VT300 emulation
- Tektronix 4010 emulation
- File transfer protocols (Kermit, XMODEM, YMODEM, ZMODEM, B-PLUS and Quick-VAN)
- Scripts using the "Tera Term Language"

== Common versions ==
- 1.4 Last version supporting Win16; source available in Pascal
- 2.3 Last version released by T. Teranishi
- 3.1.3 Last version released by Ayera. Has issues with scroll window boundaries. Title bar identifies it as version 3.1

== Screenshots ==
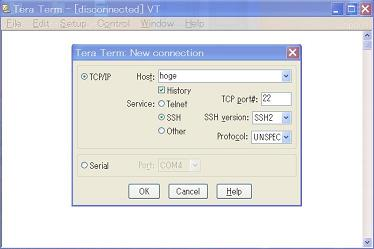

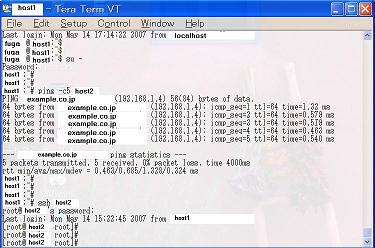

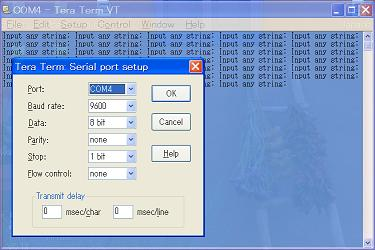

== See also ==
- Comparison of SSH clients
- PuTTY
- Telix - MSDOS era terminal
