= WinSCP =

File transfer software for Windows

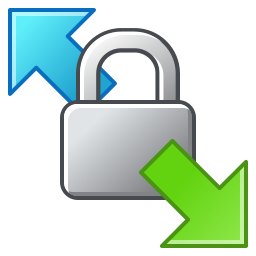

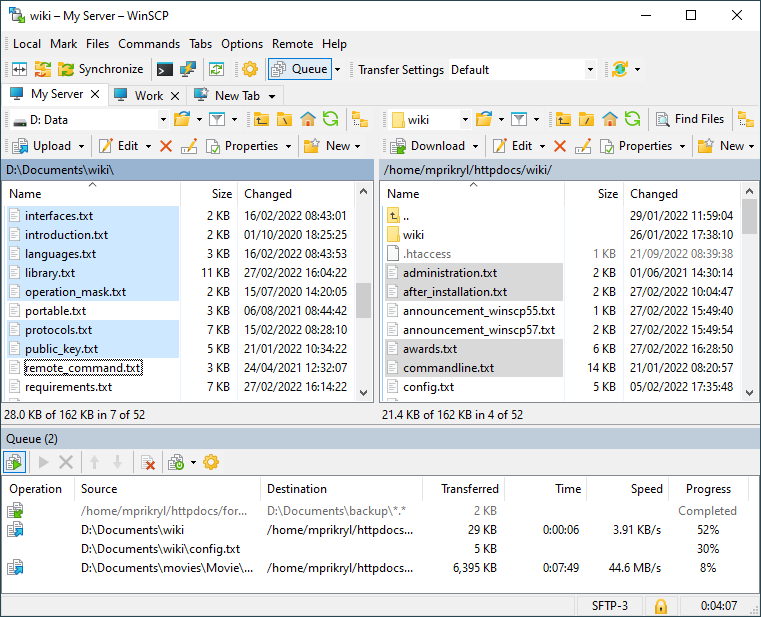
- Screenshot of WinSCP 6.1
- Developer: Martin Přikryl
- Release: 2000; 26 years ago
- Stable release: 6.7 / 14 October 2026
- Written in: C++
- Operating system: Microsoft Windows
- Size: 40–100 MB
- Available in: 45 languages
- Type: File Manager
- License: GNU General Public License 3
- Website: winscp.net
- Repository: github.com/winscp/winscp

WinSCP ("Windows Secure Copy") is a file manager, SSH File Transfer Protocol (SFTP), File Transfer Protocol (FTP), WebDAV, Amazon S3, and secure copy protocol (SCP) client for Microsoft Windows. The WinSCP project has released its source code on GitHub under an open source license, while the program itself is distributed as proprietary freeware.

== Program ==
Its main function is secure file transfer between a local computer and a remote server. Beyond this, WinSCP offers basic file manager and file synchronization functionality. For secure transfers, it uses the Secure Shell protocol (SSH) and supports the SCP protocol in addition to SFTP.

Development of WinSCP started around March 2000 and continues. Originally it was hosted by the University of Economics in Prague, where its author worked at the time. Since July 16, 2003, the program and its source code is licensed under the GNU GPL. It is hosted on SourceForge and GitHub.

WinSCP is based on the implementation of the SSH protocol from PuTTY and FTP protocol from FileZilla. It is also available as a plugin for Altap Salamander file manager, and there exists a third-party plugin for the FAR file manager.

== Features ==
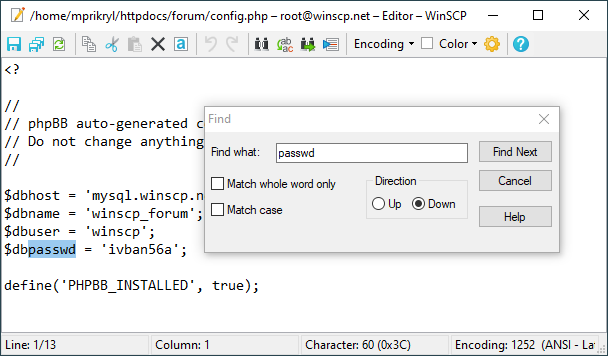
An internal editor window

- Graphical user interface
- Translated into several languages
- Integration with Windows (drag and drop, URL, shortcut icons)
- All common operations with files, both remote and local
- Support for SFTP and SCP protocols over SSH, FTP protocol, WebDAV protocol and Amazon S3 protocol.
- Batch file scripting, command-line interface, and .NET wrapper
- Can act as a remote text editor, either downloading a file to edit or passing it on to a local application, then uploading it again when updated.
- Directory synchronization in several semi or fully automatic ways
- Support for SSH password, keyboard-interactive, public key, and Kerberos (GSS) authentication
- Integrates with Pageant (PuTTY authentication agent) for full support of public key authentication with SSH
- Choice of Windows File Explorer-like or Norton Commander-like interfaces
- Optionally protects stored site information with master password
- Optionally import session information from PuTTY sessions
- Able to upload files and retain associated original date/timestamps, unlike FTP clients

Apart from the standard package, three portable versions are also available: A generic package and two customized versions for LiberKey and PortableApps.com. The portable version runs on Wine on several POSIX-compliant operating systems, such as Linux, macOS, and BSD.

Some older versions of the WinSCP installer included OpenCandy advertising module or bundled Google Chrome. Since version 5.5.5 (August 2014) the installer does not contain any advertisement.

== See also ==
- Comparison of file managers
- Comparison of SSH clients
