= ConnectBot =

Secure Shell client for Android

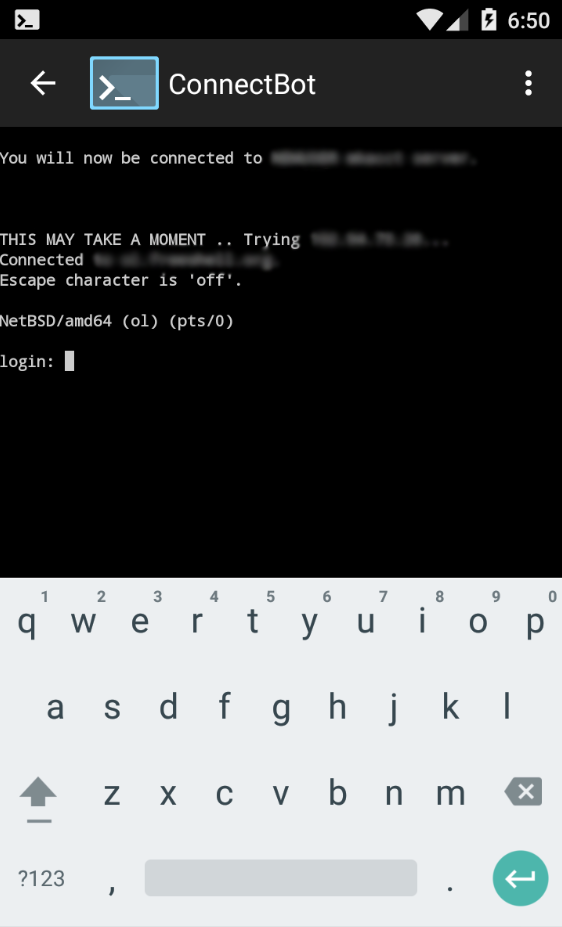
- ConnectBot running under Android Lollipop
- Initial release: October 1, 2008; 17 years ago
- Stable release: 1.9.10 / 21 December 2023
- Repository: github.com/connectbot/connectbot
- Written in: Java
- Operating system: Android (4.0 and newer)
- License: Apache-2.0
- Website: connectbot.org

ConnectBot is an open-source Secure Shell client for the Android operating system. It lets users securely log in remotely to servers that run a secure shell daemon. This allows the user to enter commands from their Android device and have the commands run on the remote server instead of the local android device. It uses the standard encryption used by SSH2 to keep any commands and data that are transmitted from being eavesdropped by any potential listeners across the network.

== Features ==
- It supports login with a username and password to any arbitrary server on the local network or internet
- Supports connections based on a public/private keypair instead of username/password for increased security
- Allows frequently accessed hosts to be saved in a menu, so that they can quickly be re-connected to

Once the connection has been made with the remote server, the program presents the user with a terminal where input and output can be sent/received just as if the user were sitting in front of a terminal on the actual server.

== Reception ==
ConnectBot is the most popular Secure Shell client available for the Android operating system, with over 1,000,000 downloads and more than 43,000 ratings on Google Play with an average rating of 4.5/5.

== Products based on ConnectBot ==
- Georgia SoftWorks (GSW) ConnectBot on Google Play. Adds commercial mass deployment features including network licensing, configuration from a MS Windows server, version updates from LAN, strong security algorithms not using SHA-1.

== See also ==
- Comparison of SSH clients
- Secure Shell
