= PuTTY =

Terminal emulator and file transfer program

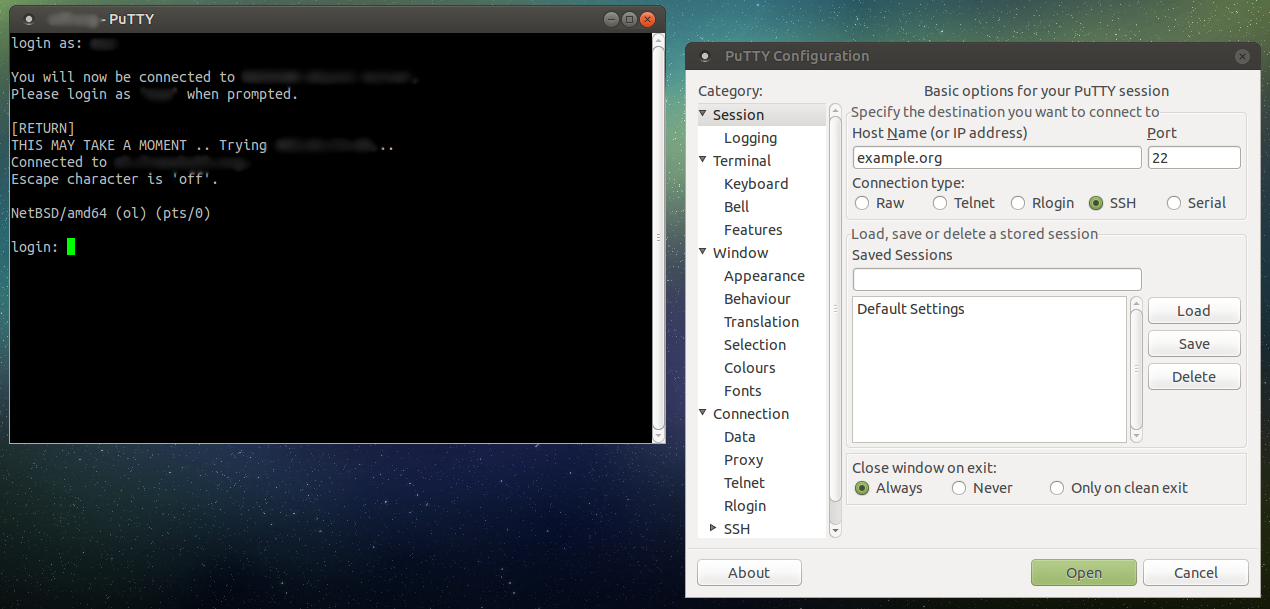
- A screenshot of PuTTY running under Ubuntu MATE
- Developer: Simon Tatham
- Release: January 8, 1999; 27 years ago
- Stable release: 0.85 / 16 August 2026
- Written in: C
- Operating system: Microsoft Windows, ReactOS, macOS, Linux
- Type: Terminal emulator
- License: MIT License
- Website: www.chiark.greenend.org.uk/~sgtatham/putty/
- Repository: git.tartarus.org?p=simon%2Fputty.git

PuTTY (/ˈpʌti/) is a free and open-source terminal emulator, serial console and network file transfer application. It supports several network protocols, including SCP, SSH, Telnet, rlogin, and raw socket connection. It can also connect to a serial port. The name "PuTTY" has no official meaning.

PuTTY was originally written for Microsoft Windows, but it has been ported to various other operating systems. Official ports are available for some Unix-like platforms, with work-in-progress ports to Classic Mac OS and macOS, and unofficial ports have been contributed to platforms such as Symbian, Windows Mobile and Windows Phone.

PuTTY was written and is maintained primarily by Simon Tatham, a British programmer.

== Features ==
PuTTY supports many variations on the secure remote terminal, and provides user control over the SSH encryption key and protocol version, alternate ciphers such as AES, 3DES, RC4, Blowfish, DES, and public-key authentication. PuTTY uses its own format of key files – PPK (protected by Message Authentication Code). PuTTY supports SSO through GSSAPI, including user provided GSSAPI DLLs. It also can emulate control sequences from xterm, VT220, VT102 or ECMA-48 terminal emulation, and allows local, remote, or dynamic port forwarding with SSH (including X11 forwarding). The network communication layer supports IPv6, and the SSH protocol supports the zlib@openssh.com delayed compression scheme. It can also be used with local serial port connections.

PuTTY comes bundled with command-line SCP and SFTP clients, called "pscp" and "psftp" respectively, and plink, a command-line connection tool, used for non-interactive sessions.

PuTTY does not support session tabs directly, but many wrappers are available that do.

== History ==
PuTTY development began in 1996, and was a usable SSH-2 client by October 2000.

== Components ==
PuTTY consists of several components:

PuTTY
the Telnet, rlogin, and SSH client itself, which can also connect to a serial port
PSCP
an SCP client, i.e. command-line secure file copy. Can also use SFTP to perform transfers
PSFTP
an SFTP client, i.e. general file transfer sessions much like FTP
PuTTYtel
a Telnet-only client
Plink
a command-line interface to the PuTTY back ends. Usually used for SSH Tunneling
Pageant
an SSH authentication agent for PuTTY, PSCP and Plink
PuTTYgen
an RSA, DSA, ECDSA and EdDSA key generation utility
pterm
(Unix version only) an X11 client which supports the same terminal emulation as PuTTY

== See also ==
- Comparison of SSH clients
- Tera Term
- mintty
- WinSCP
- minicom
