= HyTelnet =

Early attempt at creating a universal online interface

HyTelnet (sometimes rendered Hytelnet or HYTELNET) was an early attempt to create a universal database for the various Telnet-based information resources available before the World Wide Web. It was first developed in 1990 by Peter Scott, then at the University of Saskatchewan in Saskatoon, Canada. Using a client written by Earl Fogel, HyTelnet offered its users a primitive terminal-based GUI that allowed them to browse a directory of Telnet-based resources and then access them in a relatively standardized manner. On-line help was available, and there were frequent updates made available to its database which sites could download.

HyTelnet's chief inadequacy was that it was not centralized, i.e., every HyTelnet installation used its own separate copy of the master directory. While beneficial early-on, as it ensured no dependence on a central server, HyTelnet's user experience could vary widely as local installations might not have the same version of the client or might have obsolete information. This became a greater liability as more institutions had reliable, "always-on" Internet access. Finally, when the World Wide Web gained pre-eminence, many of the services that HyTelnet pointed to were gradually retired, increasingly limiting its relevance. HyTelnet's final database update was in 1997.

== Interface ==
This is a typical HyTelnet screen running much as a user would have experienced it, rendered in non-proportional font to simulate a terminal. This is from one of the last releases of the client, which was version 6.9.

                   Welcome to HYTELNET version 6.9
Original version dated June 11, 1995 with updated database as of June 8, 1997

                  What is HYTELNET?         <WHATIS>
                  Library catalogs          <SITES1>
                  Other resources           <SITES2>
                  Help files for catalogs   <OP000>
                  Catalog interfaces        <SYS000>
                  Internet Glossary         <GLOSSARY>
                  Telnet tips               <TELNET>
                  Telnet/TN3270 escape keys <ESCAPE.KEY>
                  Key-stroke commands       <HELP>

       .............................................................
  Up/Down arrows MOVE       Left/Right arrows SELECT     ? for HELP anytime

         m returns here     i searches the index          q quits
       .............................................................

        HYTELNET 6.9 was written by Peter Scott (scott@lights.com)
       Northern Lights Internet Solutions, Saskatoon, Sask, Canada

Items in angle brackets < > are selectable, and can be highlighted by using the cursor motion keys. There is a prominent online help option. The right arrow/cursor key selects the highlighted option, or ENTER/RETURN. The left key allows users to back up to an earlier level.

The search option allows a simple search of a central INDEX file. This INDEX file is one-line-per-resource, and is a flat file that the Hytelnet client searches directly. After entering a term, the client returns a new menu with the list of selectable items, for example this query "library":

<SITES1> On-Line Library Catalogs
<PL008>  National Library of Poland (Biblioteka Narodawa)
<HU007>  Hungarian National Library
<BE004>  Faculty of Agriculture Library - Gembloux
<BE010>  Royal Library Albert I (Belgium)
<TW004>  National Central Library
<TW013>  Taiwan Provincial Library at Taichung
<DK001>  Danish National Library of Science and Medicine
<DK002>  Royal Danish Library
<DK007>  Denmark's Technical Library
<DK012>  Danish Veterinary and Agricultural Library (AGROLINE)
<IT009>  Vatican Library (Biblioteca Apostolica Vaticana)
<US200>  Washington University in St. Louis Medical Library
<US202>  Waterways Online Library Facilities
<US215>  New York State Library
<US227>  University of Texas at Austin Tarlton Law Library (TALLONS)
<US229>  Boston Library Consortium Union List of Serials
<US251>  University of California Northern Regional Library Facility
<US256>  University of Miami Medical Library
<US258>  OhioLink: Ohio Library and Information Network
<US266>  University of Virginia Health Sciences Library
<US268>  Abilene Library Consortium (Texas)
<US285>  University of Alabama, Birmingham, Lister Hill Health Sciences Library—press space for more --

The user may then select one of these options, or go back with the left arrow. Search results will vary based on the locally installed database.

After drilling down to a specific resource, HyTelnet will display a connect page. The hostname, IP address and contact address are for example purposes only, and may not necessarily connect to anything functional (although this is a real entry in HyTelnet's last released database).

                  University of California (MELVYL)

telnet melvyl.ucop.edu or 192.35.222.222
When asked for terminal type, enter VT100 or HELP for other options
Press RETURN when prompted to

To exit, type END

Contact:

preferred address:  MELVYL System User Services  melvyl@dla.ucop.edu

At this point, the user could select the "telnet" portion and attempt to connect to the remote host over Telnet. Instructions for using the resource are given. Additional instructions for general types of library and research systems were also given in HyTelnet, such as this one for INNOPAC, a common library electronic card cataloguing database:

                            Using INNOPAC

INNOPAC is very easy to use. Just press the letter or number next to the
item that you want. There is no need to press the ENTER or RETURN key
when choosing one of the menu options. For example:

Title searches:     To search for a particular title, select T on
                    the main menu.

Author searches:    To search for a particular author, select A on
                    the main menu.

Subject searches:   To search for a particular subject, select S
                    on the main menu.

Keyword searches:   Either "k" or "w" (varies from system to system) as
                    listed on the menu.

Other search options: Different INNOPAC libraries have added additional
                    search options, such as Medical Subject Headings,
                    Call Number, SuDocs numbers, Reserve Lists, etc.

Popular options available when looking at any one record include:
        S > Show items with the SAME SUBJECT
        Z > Show items nearby on the shelf

The regular updates not only updated the list of resources, but also the help files in addition.

== Modern implementations ==
The HyTelnet client is no longer maintained, but there are several web-based re-creations available.

- HYTELNET on the World Wide Web is the official implementation by default, as it is Peter Scott (the original author)'s own work at his Northern Lights Internet site. This is a simple reconstruction of the HyTelnet database, converted into flat HTML files suitable for any Web browser. There is also a simple search facility.
- The Floodgap Hytelnet-HTTP Museum Gateway is a variation that attempts to mimic the look and feel of HyTelnet in a web browser, using non-proportional fonts and a similar navigational style (although now point-and-click because it is running in a browser). It enhances the experience slightly with JavaScript, although it offers versions for older browsers and an "ultra-classic" view to best simulate the old interface. It also has a simple search facility. Unlike the original HyTelnet, this implementation will attempt to verify remote hosts, and will also present possible Web-based alternatives to their databases.

== See also ==
- Telnet
- Gopher protocol
