= Files transferred over shell protocol =

Computer protocol

Files transferred over Shell protocol (FISH) is a network protocol that uses Secure Shell (SSH) or Remote Shell (RSH) to transfer files between computers and manage remote files.

The advantage of FISH is that all it requires on the server-side is an SSH or RSH implementation, Unix shell, and a set of standard Unix utilities (like ls, cat or dd—unlike other methods of remote access to files via a remote shell, scp for example, which requires scp on the server side). Optionally, there can be a special FISH server program (called start_fish_server) on the server, which executes FISH commands instead of Unix shell and thus speeds up operations.

The protocol was designed by Czech Linux Kernel Hacker, Pavel Machek, in 1998 for the Midnight Commander software tool.

== Protocol messages ==
Client sends text requests of the following form:

#FISH_COMMAND arguments...
equivalent shell commands,
which may be multi-line

Fish commands are all defined, shell equivalents may vary. Fish commands always have priority: the server is expected to execute a fish command if it understands it. If it does not, however, it can try to execute a shell command. When there is no special server program, Unix shell ignores the fish command as a comment and executes the equivalent shell command(s).

Server replies are multi-line, but always end with

### xyz<optional text>

line. ### is a prefix to mark this line, xyz is the return code. Return codes are a superset to those used in FTP. The codes 000 and 001 are special, their meaning depends on presence of server output before the end line.

== Session initiation ==
The client initiates SSH or RSH connection with echo FISH:;/bin/sh as the command executed on remote machine. This should make it possible for the server to distinguish FISH connections from normal RSH or SSH.

The first two commands sent to the server are FISH and VER to negotiate FISH protocol, its version and extensions.

 #FISH
 echo; start_fish_server; echo '### 200'

 #VER 0.0.2 <feature1> <feature2> <...>
 echo '### 000'

The server may reply to VER command with a lines like

VER 0.0.0 <feature2> <...>
### 200

which indicates supported version of the FISH protocol and supported extensions.

== Implementations ==
- Midnight Commander
- far2l
- lftp
- fish:// KDE kioslave (with Konqueror, Krusader or Dolphin)
- fish as tcl-vfs
- FISH was implemented in Emacs TRAMP some time ago, but support was removed (although TRAMP still can use shell connections in a similar way using tramp-sh.el script file)

== See also ==
- SSHFS
- SSH File Transfer Protocol
