= Lsh =

Cryptographic network protocol

lsh
- Developer: Niels Möller
- Initial release: September 1998; 27 years ago
- Stable release: 2.1 / 26 June 2013
- Operating system: Unix-like
- Type: Networking, Security
- License: GPL-2.0-or-later
- Website: www.lysator.liu.se/~nisse/lsh/
- Repository: git.lysator.liu.se/lsh/lsh.git

lsh is a copyleft implementation of the Secure Shell (SSH) protocol version 2, by the GNU Project including both server and client programs. Featuring Secure Remote Password protocol (SRP) as specified in secsh-srp besides, public-key authentication. Kerberos is somewhat supported as well. Currently however for password verification only, not as a single sign-on (SSO) method.

lsh was started from scratch and predates OpenSSH.

Karim Yaghmour concluded in 2003 that lsh was "not fit for use" in production embedded Linux systems, because of its dependencies upon other software packages that have a multiplicity of further dependencies. The lsh package requires the GNU MP library, zlib, and liboop, the latter of which in turn requires GLib, which then requires pkg-config. Yaghmour further notes that lsh suffers from cross-compilation problems that it inherits from glib. "If ... your target isn't the same architecture as your host," he states, "LSH isn't a practical choice at this time."

Debian provides packages of lsh as lsh-server, lsh-utils, lsh-doc and lsh-client.

== See also ==
- Comparison of SSH servers
- Comparison of SSH clients
- TCP Wrappers
- GnuTLS
