= SecureCRT =

Telnet client by VanDyke Software

- SecureCRT for Windows 7 connected to several servers
- Developer: VanDyke Software
- Initial release: October 4, 1995; 30 years ago

Stable release(s)
- iOS: 4.0.0 / 21 October 2025
- Linux: 9.6.4 / 16 September 2025
- macOS: 9.6.4 / 16 September 2025
- Windows: 9.6.4 / 16 September 2025
- Platform: Windows, macOS, Linux, Unix
- Type: Terminal emulator
- License: Proprietary
- Website: VanDyke Software, Inc.

SecureCRT is a commercial SSH and Telnet client and terminal emulator by VanDyke Software. Originally a Windows product, VanDyke later added a Mac OS X version in 2010 with release v6.6 and a Linux version in 2011 with release v6.7.

== History ==
SecureCRT is a GUI-based telnet client and terminal emulator originally called CRT. It was first released in the autumn of 1995 by VanDyke Software. Originally released as a premium version of CRT with support for SSH encryption, SecureCRT later absorbed the CRT product entirely. The program is part of a line of networking software which includes SecureFX, a file transfer client with SSL capability, and VShell, an SSH server.

SecureCRT and SecureFX can be started from within each other and use a combined host information list. A separately-sold pack of command-line tools (e.g., scp, modeled after the Unix command of the same name) for use with VShell is also sold by the company. All offerings are commercialware.

== Features ==
- Graphical user interface with tab support and configurable sessions
- Extensive protocol support (SSH1, SSH2, RDP, Telnet, Telnet over SSL, Rlogin, Serial, TAPI)
- Support for a large number of ciphers: AES-128, AES-192, AES-256, AES-128-CTR, AES-192-CTR, AES-256-CTR, Twofish, Blowfish, 3DES, and RC4
- Advanced SSH features including public key assistant, X.509, smart card and GSSAPI support, X11 forwarding, tunneling of other protocols,
- Advanced terminal emulation capabilities (VT100, VT102, VT220, ANSI, SCO ANSI, Wyse 50/60, Xterm, and Linux terminals) with full Unicode support
- 128,000-line scrollback and unlimited logging capabilities
- WSH Scripting support, meaning it can be programmed in VBScript, JScript, PerlScript, ooRexxScript, PythonScript, TclScript, PHPScript, variants of Delphi, Rexx, Basic, and any other available WSH scripting engines.
- File transfers available via SecureFX integration
- FIPS compliance

== Compatibility ==
SecureCRT runs on Windows XP, Windows Vista and Windows 7, Windows 8, Windows 10 and Windows 11. It also runs on the Windows Server series of operating systems. For Windows Vista and later, a 64-bit version is available for download.

SecureCRT is also available for macOS and Linux Ubuntu.

== Export restrictions ==
SecureCRT is developed in New Mexico, and is therefore subject to United States export restrictions.
