= Telnet =

Network protocol for virtual terminals

- Communication protocol
- OSI layer: Application layer
- IP number: TCP
- Ports: 23 (unencrypted); 992 (secured over TLS/SSL)
- RFCs: 854 (Specification); 855 (Options); 5198 (Unicode)

Telnet (sometimes stylized TELNET) is a client-server application protocol that provides access to virtual terminals of remote systems on local area networks or the Internet. It is a protocol for bidirectional 8-bit communications. Its main goal was to connect terminal devices and terminal-oriented processes.

The name "Telnet" refers to two things: a protocol specifying how two parties are to communicate and a software application that implements the protocol as a service. User data is interspersed in-band with Telnet control information in an 8-bit byte oriented data connection over the Transmission Control Protocol (TCP). Telnet transmits all information including usernames and passwords in plaintext so it is not recommended for security-sensitive applications such as remote management of routers. Telnet's use for this purpose has waned significantly in favor of SSH. Some extensions to Telnet which would provide encryption have been proposed.

== Description ==
The telnet protocol is a client-server protocol that runs on a reliable connection-oriented transport. Most often, a telnet client connects over TCP to port 23 or 2323, where a Telnet server application is listening. The Telnet protocol abstracts any terminal as a Network Virtual Terminal (NVT). The client must simulate a NVT using the NVT codes when messaging the server.

Telnet predated UDP/IP and originally ran over Network Control Protocol (NCP). The telnet service is best understood in the context of a user with a simple terminal using the local Telnet program (known as the client program) to run a logon session on a remote computer where the user's communications needs are handled by a Telnet server program.

=== Telnet service ===
A Telnet service is an application providing services over the Telnet protocol. Most operating systems provide a service that can be installed or enabled to provide Telnet services to clients.

=== Name ===
The official specification stylizes the name as TELNET, which is not used as an acronym or abbreviation.

In a 1972 paper, when discussing one of the early forms of the protocol, Stephen Crocker et al. used "TELNET" explicitly as an abbreviation of "telecommunications network".

In his 2015 book WHOIS Running the Internet: Protocol, Policy, and Privacy, Internet researcher Garth O. Bruen claims that Telnet was originally short for "Teletype Over Network Protocol".

== History ==
Telnet was originally developed for ARPANET in 1969. An early description appears in RFC 15, written by C. Stephen Carr of the University of Utah in September 1969, which proposed "a sub-system called 'Telnet'" that would let a terminal at one host work as a terminal at a remote host. Initially, it was an ad hoc protocol with no formal specification, but after extensive work in the 1970s, including numerous RFCs, it was officially formalized in RFC 854 and RFC 855, which together form Internet standard 8.

Since then, many additional RFCs have updated or extended the Telnet specification, both to address issues in the original standard and to add new capabilities. Some of these extensions have also been adopted as Internet standards, particularly standards 27 through 32 (see below).

== Security vulnerabilities ==
Telnet is vulnerable to network-based cyberattacks, such as packet sniffing sensitive information including passwords and fingerprinting. Telnet services can be exploited to leak information about the server (such as hostnames, IP addresses, and brand) by packet sniffing the banner. This information can then be searched to determine if a Telnet service accepts a connection without authentication. Telnet is frequently exploited by malware due to being improperly configured. Telnet is targeted by attackers more frequently than other common protocols, especially when compared to UPnP, CoAP, MQTT, AMQP, and XMPP. Common devices targeted are Internet of things devices, routers, and modems.

The SANS Institute recommends that the use of Telnet for remote logins should be discontinued under normal circumstances for the following reasons:

- Telnet, by default, does not encrypt any data sent over the connection (including passwords), and so it is often feasible to eavesdrop on the communications and use the password later for malicious purposes; anybody who has access to a router, switch, hub or gateway located on the network between the two hosts where Telnet is being used can intercept the packets passing by and obtain login, password and whatever else is typed with a packet analyzer.
- Many Telnet implementations lack authentication.
- Most Telnet authentication mechanisms are vulnerable to being intercepted by Man-in-the-middle attacks.

Extensions to Telnet provide Transport Layer Security (TLS) security and Simple Authentication and Security Layer (SASL) authentication that address the above concerns. However, most Telnet implementations do not support these extensions; and they do not address other vulnerabilities such as parsing the banner information. Telnet over VPN is a viable option if SSHv2 is not supported, or a VPN is already used to securely tunnel other application data to the remote network the Telnet server is present in. However, precautions must be taken: ideally the VPN should terminate on the Telnet server itself, unless the LAN has additional security measures against eavesdropping and modification by other devices such as additional encryption and/or VLANs. This is because Telnet traffic leaves the VPN server in its insecure plaintext form after it is decrypted. The VPN software should be a trusted one that is heavily audited (e.g. OpenVPN, WireGuard, IPsec), using preferably certificate-based/public key mutual authentication.

IBM 5250 or 3270 workstation emulation is supported via custom telnet clients, TN5250/TN3270, and IBM i systems. Clients and servers designed to pass IBM 5250 data streams over Telnet generally do support SSL encryption, as SSH does not include 5250 emulation. Under IBM i (also known as OS/400), port 992 is the default port for TelnetS (Telnet over SSL/TLS).

== Uses ==
=== Historical ===
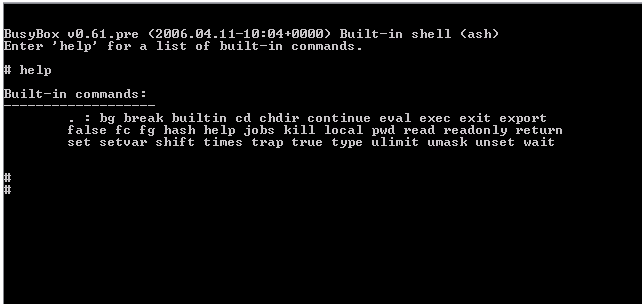
BusyBox runs under the Microsoft Telnet Client from a router.

Historically, Telnet provided access to a command-line interface on a remote host. However, because of serious security concerns when using Telnet over an open network such as the Internet, its use for this purpose has waned significantly in favor of SSH. The usage of Telnet for remote management has declined rapidly, especially on the public Internet, in favor of the Secure Shell (SSH) protocol. SSH provides much of the functionality of telnet, with the addition of strong encryption to prevent sensitive data such as passwords from being intercepted, and public key authentication, to ensure that the remote computer is actually who it claims to be.

=== Modern ===
The Telnet protocol is mainly used for legacy equipment that does not support more modern communication mechanisms. For example, many industrial and scientific devices only have Telnet available as a communication option. Some are built with only a standard RS-232 port and use a serial server hardware appliance to provide the translation between the TCP/Telnet data and the RS-232 serial data. In such cases, SSH is not an option unless the interface appliance can be configured for SSH (or is replaced with one supporting SSH).

Telnet support has become highly unusual in new applications, though amateur radio operators and multi-user dungeons do continue to utilize it. Telnet is a popular protocol to connect to the roughly 1000 Bulletin Board Systems (BBS) that are on the Internet.

Security researchers estimated that 7,096,465 exposed systems on the Internet continue to use Telnet as of 2021. However, estimates of this number have varied significantly, depending on the number of ports scanned beyond the default TCP port 23.

The Telnet client may be used in debugging network services such as SMTP, IRC, or HTTP servers, to issue commands to the server and examine the responses. In this case, when the Telnet client establishes a TCP connection to a port other than the standard Telnet server port, it does not use the Telnet protocol, and can be used instead to send and receive data over the TCP connection directly.

== Technical details ==
The technical details of Telnet are defined by a variety of specifications including RFC 854.

=== Commands ===
Telnet commands consist of at least two bytes. The first byte is the IAC escape character (byte 255) followed by the byte code for a given command:

Name	Byte Value (dec)	Byte value (hex)	Explanation
SE (Subnegotiation end)	240	0xf0	End of negotiation (or data block) of a sub-service of a protocol mechanism
NOP (No operation)	241	0xf1	Data packet that does nothing
Data Mark	242	0xf2	
Break	243	0xf3	
Interrupt Process	244	0xf4	Request that other party ends current process
Abort output	245	0xf5	Request that other party stops sending output
Are you there?	246	0xf6	
Erase character	247	0xf7	
Erase Line	248	0xf8	
Go ahead	249	0xf9	
SB (Subnegotiation begin)	250	0xfa	Initiate the negotiation of a sub-service of a protocol mechanism
WILL	251	0xfb	Informs other party that this party will use a protocol mechanism
WON'T	252	0xfc	Informs other party that this party will not use a protocol mechanism
DO	253	0xfd	Instruct other party to use a protocol mechanism
DON'T	254	0xfe	Instruct other party to not use a protocol mechanism
IAC	255	0xff	Sequence Initializer/Escape Character
Source: J. Postel and Reynolds (1983)

==== Interpret As Command ====
All data octets except 0xff are transmitted over Telnet as is. (0xff, or 255 in decimal, is the IAC byte (Interpret As Command) which signals that the next byte is a telnet command. The command to insert 0xff into the stream is 0xff, so 0xff must be escaped by doubling it when sending data over the telnet protocol.)

=== Options ===
Telnet has a variety of options that terminals implementing Telnet should support.

Telnet Options
Code	Name	Spec	Notes
0	Binary Transmission	RFC 856	The 8-bit mode (so named binary option) is intended to transmit binary data, not ASCII characters. The standard suggests the interpretation of codes 0000–0176 as ASCII, but does not offer any meaning for high-bit-set data octets. There was an attempt to introduce a switchable character encoding support like HTTP has, but nothing is known about its actual software support.
1	Echo	RFC 857	
2	Reconnection	NIC 15391 of 1973	
3	Suppress Go Ahead	RFC 858	The "Go Ahead" command code (249) in the original Telnet protocol is used to notify to the other end that the other end could start sending back messages. This was used in "half duplex" communication, as some terminals could send messages and receive messages, but not simultaneously.
4	Approx Message Size Negotiation	NIC 15393 of 1973	
5	Status	RFC 859	
6	Timing Mark	RFC 860	
7	Remote Controlled Trans and Echo	RFC 726	
8	Output Line Width	NIC 20196 of August 1978	
9	Output Page Size	NIC 20197 of August 1978	
10	Output Carriage-Return Disposition	RFC 652	
11	Output Horizontal Tab Stops	RFC 653	
12	Output Horizontal Tab Disposition	RFC 654	
13	Output Formfeed Disposition	RFC 655	
14	Output Vertical Tabstops	RFC 656	
15	Output Vertical Tab Disposition	RFC 657	
16	Output Linefeed Disposition	RFC 658	
17	Extended ASCII	RFC 698	
18	Logout	RFC 727	
19	Byte Macro	RFC 735	
20	Data Entry Terminal	RFC 1043; RFC 732	
21	SUPDUP	RFC 736; RFC 734	
22	SUPDUP Output	RFC 749	
23	Send Location	RFC 779	
24	Terminal Type	RFC 1091	
25	End of Record	RFC 885	
26	TACACS User Identification	RFC 927	
27	Output Marking	RFC 933	
28	Terminal Location Number	RFC 946	
29	Telnet 3270 Regime	RFC 1041	
30	X.3 PAD	RFC 1053	
31	Negotiate About Window Size	RFC 1073	
32	Terminal Speed	RFC 1079	
33	Remote Flow Control	RFC 1372	
34	Linemode	RFC 1184	
35	X Display Location	RFC 1096	
36	Environment Option	RFC 1408	
37	Authentication Option	RFC 2941	
38	Encryption Option	RFC 2946	
39	New Environment Option	RFC 1572	
40	TN3270E	RFC 2355	See IBM 3270
41	XAUTH		
42	CHARSET	RFC 2066	
43	Telnet Remote Serial Port (RSP)		
44	Com Port Control Option	RFC 2217	
45	Telnet Suppress Local Echo		
46	Telnet Start TLS		
47	KERMIT	RFC 2840	See Kermit (protocol)
48	SEND-URL		
49	FORWARD_X		
50-137	Unassigned		
138	TELOPT PRAGMA LOGON		
139	TELOPT SSPI LOGON		
140	TELOPT PRAGMA HEARTBEAT		
141-254	Unassigned		
255	Extended-Options-List	RFC 861	
Source: Internet Assigned Numbers Authority (n.d.)

== Client applications ==
- AbsoluteTelnet is a telnet client for Windows. It also supports SSH and SFTP.
- cURL is a multi protocol transfer tool and library
- Inetutils includes a telnet client and server and is installed by default on many Linux distributions.
- Line Mode Browser, a command line web browser
- NCSA Telnet
- PuTTY and plink command line are a free, open-source SSH, Telnet, rlogin, and raw TCP client for Windows, Linux, and Unix.
- Rtelnet is a SOCKS client version of Telnet, providing similar functionality of telnet to those hosts which are behind firewall and NAT.
- RUMBA
- SecureCRT from Van Dyke Software
- SyncTERM is a BBS terminal program supporting Telnet, SSHv2, RLogin, Serial, Windows, *nix, and Mac OS X platforms, X/Y/ZMODEM and various BBS terminal emulations
- telnet.exe command line utility included in default installation of many versions of Microsoft Windows.
- TeraTerm
- ZOC Terminal

== In popular culture ==
Star Wars: Episode IV – A New Hope from 1977 has been recreated as an ASCII art movie served through Telnet.

== See also ==
- Banner grabbing
- HyTelnet
- Kermit
- List of terminal emulators
- Reverse telnet
- SSH
- Virtual terminal
