= File transfer protocol =

This list of communication protocols that are designed for file transfer over a telecommunications network, excludes protocols for shared file systems – such as 9P and the Network File System – and file synchronization protocols.

== Protocols for packet-switched networks ==
A packet-switched network transmits data that is divided into units called packets. A packet comprises a header (which describes the packet) and a payload (the data). The Internet is a packet-switched network, and most of the protocols in this list are designed for its protocol stack, the IP protocol suite.

They use one of two transport layer protocols: the Transmission Control Protocol (TCP) or the User Datagram Protocol (UDP). In the tables below, the "Transport" column indicates which protocol(s) the transfer protocol uses at the transport layer. Some protocols designed to transmit data over UDP also use a TCP port for oversight.

The "Server port" column indicates the port from which the server transmits data. In the case of FTP, this port differs from the listening port. Some protocols—including FTP, FTP Secure, FASP, and Tsunami—listen on a "control port" or "command port", at which they receive commands from the client.

Similarly, the encryption scheme indicated in the "Encryption" column applies to transmitted data only, and not to the authentication system.

=== Overview ===
Color key: International standard Internet Standard Proposed Standard Internet Draft
Protocol		Original author	First published	Protocol suite	Standard	Refs
Full name	Abbreviation	Original author	First published	Protocol suite	Standard	Refs
Background Intelligent Transfer Service	BITS	Microsoft	2001	—N/a	No	
BitTorrent	BT	Bram Cohen	2001	—N/a	No	
CCSDS File Delivery Protocol	CFDP		2002	—N/a	ISO 17355:2007 (v4); CCSDS 727.0-B-5	
Cross File Transfer	CFT			—N/a	No	
Ether File Transfer Protocol	EFTP	John Shoch	1979	PARC Universal Packet	No	
Fast and Secure Protocol	FASP	Ying Xu, Michelle Munson, Serban Simu	2007	—N/a	No	
File Delivery over Unidirectional Transport	FLUTE	Internet Society	2004	—N/a	RFC 6726	
File Service Protocol	FSP	Wen-King Su	1991	—N/a	No	
File Transfer Access and Management	FTAM		1988		ISO 8571-4:1988	
File Transfer Protocol	FTP	Abhay Bhushan	1971	Internet protocol suite	RFC 959	
FTP Secure	FTPS	Internet Society	1997	Internet protocol suite	RFC 2228, 4217	
HTTP Secure	HTTPS	Taher Elgamal et al.	1995	Internet protocol suite	RFC 9110	
Host Unix Linkage File Transfer	HULFT	?	1993	—N/a	No	
Hypertext Transfer Protocol	HTTP	Tim Berners-Lee et al.	1991	Internet protocol suite	RFC 9110	
Micro Transport Protocol	μTP	Ludvig Strigeus, Greg Hazel, Stanislav Shalunov, Arvid Norberg, Bram Cohen	2007	—N/a	No	
Multicast Dissemination Protocol	MDP		1993		No	
Multicast File Transfer Protocol	MFTP	C. Kenneth Miller et al.	1995	—N/a	IETF Draft (1998)	
NACK-Oriented Reliable Multicast Transport Protocol	NORM		2000		RFC 5740	
Odette File Transfer Protocol	OFTP	Organisation for Data Exchange by Tele Transmission in Europe	1986	X.25	RFC 6726	
Odette File Transfer Protocol 2	OFTP2	Organisation for Data Exchange by Tele Transmission in Europe	2007	X.25, Internet protocol suite	RFC 5024	
Reliable Blast UDP	RBUDP	Eric He et al.	2002	—N/a	No	
Remote copy	rcp	?	1982	Internet protocol suite	No	
Secure copy	SCP	Tatu Ylönen	1995	Secure Shell	No	
Secure Hypertext Transfer Protocol	S-HTTP	IETF Web Transaction Security Working Group	1999	—N/a	RFC 2660	
Simple Asynchronous File Transfer	SAFT	Ulli Horlacher	1995	—N/a	No	
Simple File Transfer Protocol	SFTP	Mark K. Lottor	1984	—N/a	RFC 913	
SSH file transfer protocol	SFTP	Tatu Ylönen	c. 1997	Secure Shell	IETF Draft (2006)	
T.127	T.127	ITU	1995	—N/a	ITU T.127	
Trivial File Transfer Protocol	TFTP	Noel Chiappa	1980	Internet protocol suite	RFC 1350	
Tsunami UDP Protocol	Tsunami	Mark Meiss et al.	2002	—N/a	No	
Tus open protocol for resumable file uploads	tus	Felix Geisendörfer, Marius Kleidl et al.	2014	—N/a	No	
UDP-based Data Transfer Protocol	UDT	Yunhong Gu	2004	—N/a	No	
UDP-based File Transfer Protocol	UFTP	Dennis Bush	2001	—N/a	No	
Unix-to-Unix Copy	UUCP	Mike Lesk	1979	—N/a	No	
Warp Speed Data Transfer	WDT	Laurent Demailly et al.	2015	—N/a	No	

=== Features ===
The "Managed" column indicates whether the protocol is designed for managed file transfer (MFT). MFT protocols prioritise secure transmission in industrial applications that require such features as auditable transaction records, monitoring, and end-to-end data security. Such protocols may be preferred for electronic data interchange.

Protocol	Encryption (data)	Transfer resuming	Multicast capable	Managed	Refs
BITS	Optional TLS / AES-128 (Note: TLS when BITS is used with HTTPS, AES-128 when used with SMB 3, none with HTTP or SMB version below 3.0)	Yes	No	No	
BitTorrent	None (Note: Some implementations can obfuscate traffic using RC4 et al. See BitTorrent protocol encryption.)	Yes	Peer-to-peer	No	
CCSDS File Delivery Protocol (CFDP)		Yes	No	No	
Cross File Transfer (CFT)	TLS / SSL				Yes
Ether File Transfer Protocol (EFTP)	None	?	No	No	
Fast and Secure Protocol (FASP)	AES-256 / AES-192 / AES-128	Yes	No		
File Delivery over Unidirectional Transport (FLUTE)	Optional/Unspecified (Note: RFC 6726 suggests IPSec as one option.)	No	Yes		
File Service Protocol (FSP)	None	Yes	No	No	
File Transfer Access and Management (FTAM)	? (Note: One implementation, Fujitsu openFT, applies AES.)				
File Transfer Protocol (FTP)	None	Yes (Note: RFC 1123 (1989) extends and corrects the provisions for restart/resume that were published in RFC 959 (1985). RFC 3659 (2007) provides for resuming in stream mode.)	No	No	
FTP Secure (FTPS)	TLS / SSL	Yes	No	No	
HTTP Secure (HTTPS)	TLS / SSL	Yes	No	No	
Host Unix Linkage File Transfer (HULFT)	AES	?	No		
Hypertext Transfer Protocol (HTTP)	None (see HTTPS and S-HTTP)	Yes	No	No	
Micro Transport Protocol (μTP)	None	Yes	Peer-to-peer	No	
Multicast Dissemination Protocol (MDP)	None		Yes	Yes	
Multicast File Transfer Protocol (MFTP)	None	Yes	Yes	No	
NACK-Oriented Reliable Multicast Transport Protocol (NORM)	IPsec		Yes	Yes	
Odette File Transfer Protocol (OFTP)	None			Yes	
Odette File Transfer Protocol 2 (OFTP2)	TLS			Yes	
Reliable Blast UDP (RBUDP)	None	No	No		
Remote copy (rcp)	None	No	No	No	
Secure copy (SCP)	Secure Shell	No	No	No	
Secure Hypertext Transfer Protocol (S-HTTP)	CMS / MOSS / other	No	No	No	
Simple Asynchronous File Transfer (SAFT)	PGP	?	No	No	
Simple File Transfer Protocol (SFTP)	None	Yes	No	No	
SSH file transfer protocol (SFTP)	Secure Shell	Yes	No	No	
T.127	None	Yes	Yes	No	
Trivial File Transfer Protocol (TFTP)	None	No	No	No	
Tsunami UDP Protocol	None	No	No	No	
Tus open protocol for resumable file uploads (tus)	Optional/Unspecified (Note: It's recommended to use HTTPS provided by a webserver, proxy, or SSL terminator.)	Yes	No	No	
UDP-based Data Transfer Protocol (UDT)	Experimental	No	No	No	
UDP-based File Transfer Protocol (UFTP)	AES-256 / AES-128 / 3DES / DES (Note: These are the options in the reference implementation, which uses OpenSSL.)	Yes	Yes	No	
Unix-to-Unix Copy (UUCP)	None	Some (Note: The BNU implementation of UUCP can resume an interrupted file transfer.)	No	No	
Warp Speed Data Transfer (WDT)	AES-128 (OFB / CTR)	Yes	No	No	

=== Ports ===
In the table below, the data port is the network port or range of ports through which the protocol transmits file data. The control port is the port used for the dialogue of commands and status updates between client and server.

The column "Assigned by IANA" indicates whether the port is listed in the Service Name and Transport Protocol Port Number Registry, which is curated by the Internet Assigned Numbers Authority (IANA). IANA devotes each port number in the registry to a specific service with a specific transport protocol. The table below lists the transport protocol in the "Transport" column.

Protocol		Data port			Control port			Assigned by IANA	Assignee	Refs
Protocol		Server	Client	Transport	Server	Client	Transport	Assigned by IANA	Assignee	Refs
BITS		80/443 (Note: When used with HTTP/HTTPS, configurable) / 137–139 (Note: When used with SMB)		TCP / UDP				No	—N/a	
BitTorrent		6881 (Note: Typically, if port 6881 is unavailable as a listening port, the peer incrementally tries 6882–6889. Another port may be specified in software.)	6881	TCP	6881	6881	TCP	No	—N/a	
CCSDS File Delivery Protocol (CFDP)										
Cross File Transfer (CFT)		1761 (Note: 1761 is the default port, but 1761–1768 are allocated by IANA.)		TCP / X.25						
Ether File Transfer Protocol (EFTP)		—N/a	—N/a	None	—N/a	—N/a	None	—N/a	—N/a	
Fast and Secure Protocol (FASP)		≥33001		UDP	22		TCP	No	—N/a	
File Delivery over Unidirectional Transport (FLUTE)		4001		UDP				No	—N/a	
File Service Protocol (FSP)		Chosen by user (Note: UDP port 21 is sometimes chosen for FSP.)		UDP				No	—N/a	
File Transfer Access and Management (FTAM)		4800 / 102		TCP						
File Transfer Protocol (FTP)	Active mode	20	20	TCP (Note: FTP was originally designed for NCP, a protocol used on ARPANET before the advent of TCP. The TCP implementation of FTP was standardized in RFC 959.)	21	≥1024	TCP	Yes	Jon Postel	
File Transfer Protocol (FTP)	Passive mode	≥1024 (Note: The server listens on TCP port 21 (the control port), and the client sends commands to this port from a random port above 1023. To transfer data in active mode, the server initiates a connection from port 20 to the client at the randomly selected port number. In passive mode, the client uses a random port above 1023 as a control port, and from this initiates file transfer. The server sends or receives data from a randomly selected port above 1023, and the client sends or receives data from one port number above its own randomly selected control port.)	≥1024	TCP	21	≥1024	TCP	Yes	Jon Postel	
FTP Secure (FTPS)		989		TCP	990		TCP	Yes	Christopher Allen	
HTTP Secure (HTTPS)		443		TCP			TCP	Yes	IESG	
Host Unix Linkage File Transfer (HULFT)		30000		TCP			TCP	No	—N/a	
Hypertext Transfer Protocol (HTTP)		80		TCP			TCP	Yes	Tim Berners-Lee	
Micro Transport Protocol (μTP)				UDP				No	—N/a	
Multicast Dissemination Protocol (MDP)		Chosen by user		UDP						
Multicast File Transfer Protocol (MFTP)		5402		UDP				Yes	Steve Bannister	
NACK-Oriented Reliable Multicast Transport Protocol (NORM)				UDP						
Odette File Transfer Protocol (OFTP)		3305		TCP / X.25			TCP / X.25			
Odette File Transfer Protocol 2 (OFTP2)		6619		TCP / X.25			TCP / X.25			
Reliable Blast UDP (RBUDP)		Chosen by user		UDP				No	—N/a	
Remote copy (rcp)		514		TCP			TCP	Yes		
Secure copy (SCP)		22		TCP			TCP	Yes		
Secure Hypertext Transfer Protocol (S-HTTP)		80		TCP			TCP	No	—N/a	
Simple Asynchronous File Transfer (SAFT)		487		TCP				Yes	Ulli Horlacher	
Simple File Transfer Protocol (SFTP)		115		TCP			TCP	Yes	Mark Lottor	
SSH file transfer protocol (SFTP)		22		TCP			TCP	Yes		
T.127		1503		TCP			TCP	Yes	Jim Johnston	
Trivial File Transfer Protocol (TFTP)		69		UDP				Yes	David Clark	
Tsunami UDP Protocol		Chosen by user		UDP			TCP	No	—N/a	
Tus open protocol for resumable file uploads (tus)		80 (Note: Can be chosen by user, but layers on top of HTTP(S) so often 80/443)		TCP			TCP	No	—N/a	
UDP-based Data Transfer Protocol (UDT)		Chosen by server		UDP				No	—N/a	
UDP-based File Transfer Protocol (UFTP)		1044		UDP				No	—N/a	
Unix-to-Unix Copy (UUCP)		540		TCP			TCP	Yes		
Warp Speed Data Transfer (WDT)		Chosen by server or by user		TCP			TCP	No	—N/a	

== Serial protocols ==
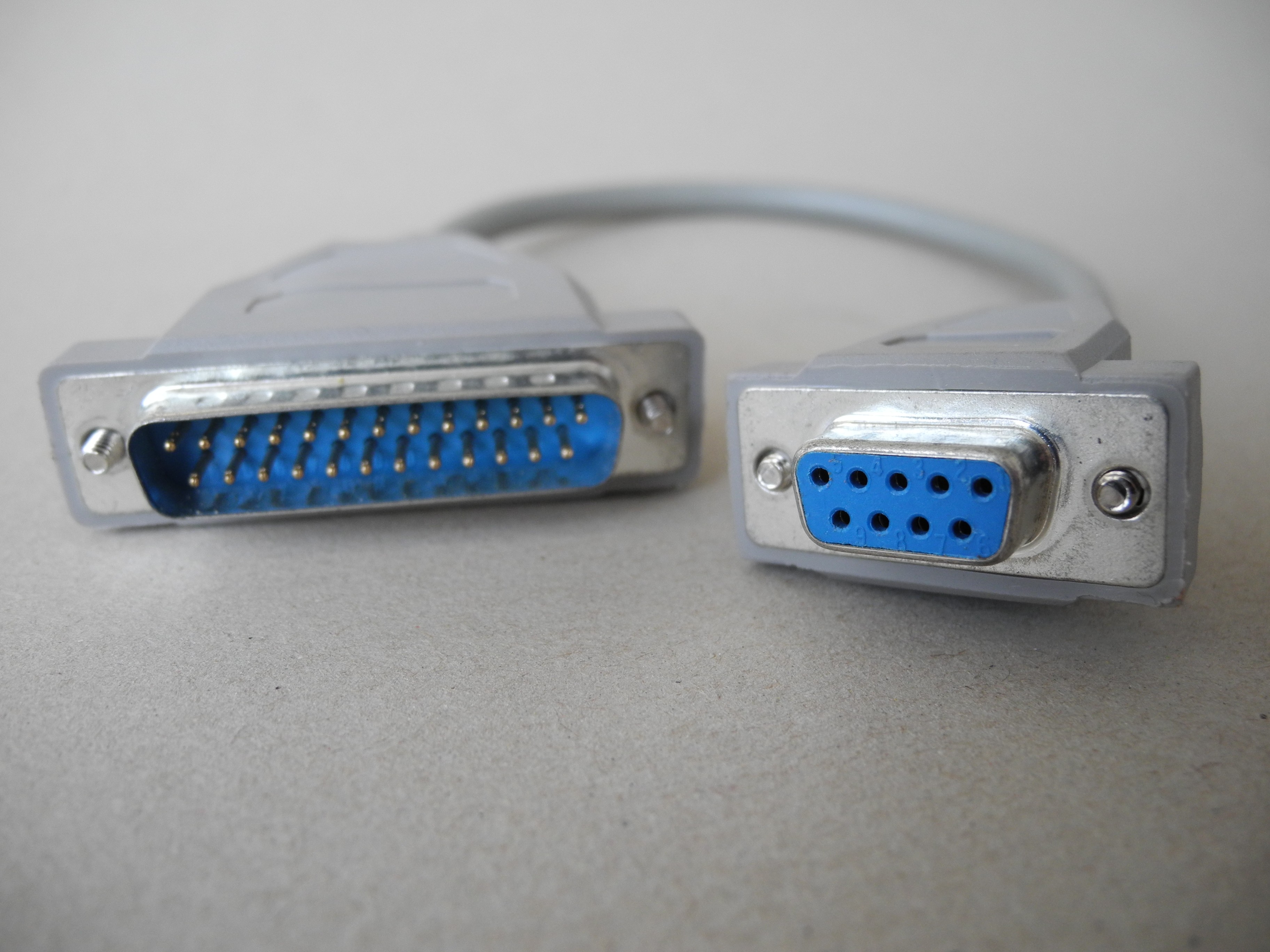
A 9-pin to 25-pin RS-232 adapter cable

The following protocols were designed for serial communication, mostly for the RS-232 standard. They are used for uploading and downloading computer files via modem or serial cable (e.g., by null modem or direct cable connection). UUCP is one protocol that can operate with either RS-232 or the Transmission Control Protocol as its transport. The Kermit protocol can operate over any computer-to-computer transport: direct serial, modem, or network (notably TCP/IP, including on connections secured by SSL, SSH, or Kerberos). OBject EXchange is a protocol for binary object wireless transfer via the Bluetooth standard. Bluetooth was conceived as a wireless replacement for RS-232.

=== Overview ===
Protocol	Author	First released	License	Description	Refs
BiModem	Erik Labs	1989		Bi-directional transfers.	
BLAST	Communications Research Group	1981		Powerful protocol originating on the Data General Nova minicomputer, and then ported to micros and mainframes.	
C-MODEM	Lavio Pareschi	1989		Packet lengths from 32 to 4096 bytes, optional (but normally used) streaming mode.	
B protocol	CompuServe	1981		Offered file transfer as well as a command stream.	
JMODEM	Richard B. Johnson	?		XMODEM derivative with blocks from 512 to 8192 bytes and RLE compression.	
HS/Link	Samuel H. Smith	1991			
Kermit	Frank da Cruz et al.	1981	Open Source (BSD) as of 2011	Transport- and platform-independent transfer of text and binary files across full- or half-duplex connections with conversion of text file formats and character sets.	
LeechModem	Sam Brown	?		Variations of X and Y that faked failed downloads in order to avoid BBS download quotas.	
Lynx	Matthew Thomas	1989		Similar to Kermit: 64-byte packets, 2 to 16 packets per window, CRC-32. Little or no support outside the Lynx program itself.	
NMODEM	L. B. Neal	1990		Essentially XMODEM-CRC with 2048 byte blocks.	
OBEX File Transfer Protocol	?	?		A synchronous file transfer protocol in the OBject EXchange (OBEX) Bluetooth profile.	
OBEX Push	?	?		An asynchronous file transfer protocol in the OBject EXchange (OBEX) Bluetooth profile.	
Punter	Steve Punter	?		Suite of similar-but-different XMODEM-like protocols for various Commodore machines.	
SEAlink	Thom Henderson	1986		A MODEM7/XMODEM-compatible protocol with sliding window support developed to avoid propagation delays in satellite transmissions and packet networks.	
SMODEM	Arisoft	?			
TMODEM	Mike Bryeans	?			
UUCP	Mike Lesk	1979		Suite of protocols for copying files between Unix machines, used for many purposes including the distribution of email. Also allows commands to be sent, which led to the first internet worms. The file transfer protocol within UUCP is the "g" protocol.	
MODEM7	Mark M. Zeigler, James K. Mills	1980		Slight extension of XMODEM to add filename support and batch transfers.	
XMODEM	Ward Christensen	1977	Public domain	Very simple protocol that saw widespread use and provided the pattern for many following protocols.	
WXMODEM	Peter Boswell	1986	Public domain	Version of XMODEM with sliding windows for higher performance.	
YMODEM	Chuck Forsberg	1985	Public domain	Series of optional expansions on XMODEM for higher performance.	
ZMax	Mike Bryeans	c. 1991		Modifications to ZMODEM to allow packets up to 32 kB in length.	
ZMODEM	Chuck Forsberg	1986	Public domain	Streaming protocol that forsakes XMODEM compatibility but offers a wide variety of new features and improved performance. Became almost universal on BBS systems in the early 1990s.	

=== Features ===
Protocol	Data block size (bytes)	Data compression	Error detection	Transfer resuming	Bidirectional	Sliding window	Refs
BiModem					Yes		
BLAST	84–1024+	RLE	CRC	Yes	Yes	Yes	
C-MODEM	32–4096		CRC	Yes			
B protocol	128–2048		CRC-32 / CRC-16 / 8-bit checksum	Yes		Yes	
JMODEM	64–8192	RLE					
HS/Link			CRC-32	Yes	Yes		
Kermit	≤9024 (negotiated)	RLE (run length encoding, negotiated)	Checksum or CRC-16 (negotiated)	Yes (binary files only, negotiated)	No	Over full-duplex only (negotiated)	
LeechModem							
Lynx		RLE	CRC-32	Yes			
NMODEM	2048						
OBject EXchange							
Punter							
SEAlink				Yes		Yes	
SMODEM					Yes		
Tmodem				No			
UUCP "g"	≤4096	No		No			
MODEM7	128	No	Checksum			Stop-and-wait ARQ	
XMODEM	128	No	Checksum			Stop-and-wait ARQ	
WXMODEM	≤512					Yes	
YMODEM	1024	No	CRC-16				
ZMax	≤~32,768		CRC-32				
ZMODEM	256 / 1024	No	CRC-32	Yes		Yes	

== See also ==
- Comparison of file-sharing applications
- Comparison of file synchronization software
- Comparison of distributed file systems
- Lists of network protocols
- List of TCP and UDP port numbers
- List of backup software
- AS2
- Connect:Direct
- Files transferred over shell protocol (FISH)
- Pragmatic General Multicast
- Sendfile
- Waarp
