= Cloud-Based Secure File Transfer =

Cloud-Based Secure File Transfer is a managed or hosted file transfer service that provides cloud storage that can be accessed via SSH File Transfer Protocol (SFTP). These services allow secure, reliable file transfers while offering the scalability, redundancy, and high availability of cloud infrastructure.

== Technical overview ==
The evolution of file transfer protocols began with File Transfer Protocol (FTP) and SSH File Transfer Protocol (SFTP). SFTP offered enhanced security through the use of SSH (Secure Shell) encryption, which addressed many of the security concerns associated with traditional FTP.

Over time, as businesses increasingly adopted cloud infrastructure, the demand for services that integrate secure file transfer with cloud storage led to the rise of Cloud-Based Secure File Transfer services. These services combine the benefits of secure, encrypted file transfer with the scalability and flexibility of cloud-based storage systems.

Traditional on-premises SFTP typically involves setting up and managing physical or virtual servers to handle file transfers. In contrast, Cloud-Based Secure File Transfer utilizes managed cloud infrastructure, such as AWS EC2, Azure VMs, or Google Cloud, to automate scaling, ensure redundancy, and provide high availability. These cloud environments can be configured to automatically scale with demand, enabling businesses to handle large volumes of data transfers without the need for extensive physical hardware.

== Features ==
- Scalability and availability: Cloud-Based Secure File Transfer services are inherently scalable, with features like load balancing, multi-region deployments, and auto-scaling groups that adjust resources in response to traffic spikes. This ensures that the system can handle varying workloads and provides continuous availability, even during high-demand periods.
- Cost-effectiveness: By eliminating the need for physical infrastructure and reducing ongoing server maintenance costs, Cloud-Based Secure File Transfer services offer significant cost savings compared to traditional on-premises services. Cloud providers typically offer pay-as-you-go pricing models, where users only pay for the resources they use, further optimizing costs.
- Security and compliance: Cloud-Based Secure File Transfer products offer strong security measures, including end-to-end encryption, key management, detailed logging, and auditing. These services are often compliant with industry regulations such as HIPAA (Health Insurance Portability and Accountability Act), GDPR (General Data Protection Regulation), and SOC 2 (System and Organization Controls), ensuring that data transfers meet necessary security and privacy standards.

== Cloud-Based Secure File Transfer providers ==
Provider	Locations	Protocols supported	Cloud storage integration	Compliance standards	Notable features
SFTP To Go	USA	SFTP, FTPS, HTTPS	AWS S3	HIPAA, GDPR, SOC2	Webhooks, API integration, Multi-AZ
AWS Transfer Family	USA	SFTP, FTPS, FTP, AS2	AWS S3, EFS	HIPAA, SOC2, ISO 27001	Native AWS integration, IAM support
Azure Blob SFTP	USA	SFTP	Azure Blob Storage	HIPAA, SOC2, GDPR	Azure AD integration, Managed Identities
Files.com	USA	SFTP, FTPS, HTTPS, AS2	AWS, Azure, GCP	HIPAA, GDPR, SOC2	Automation, API, Multi-cloud
Couchdrop	New Zealand	SFTP, FTP, AS2	Google Drive, Dropbox, AWS S3	HIPAA, GDPR, SOC2	Native cloud integrations, Automation

== Uses ==
Cloud-Based Secure File Transfer is used across various industries to securely transfer sensitive data and integrate into business workflows. In healthcare, Cloud-Based Secure File Transfer is essential for securely transferring electronic Protected Health Information (ePHI), ensuring compliance with regulations like HIPAA. In financial institutions, it is used to protect sensitive financial data during transfer, maintaining privacy and security. Data analytics also benefits from Cloud-Based Secure File Transfer, offering a secure and efficient method for transferring large datasets between systems or partners.

Technically, Cloud-Based Secure File Transfer is often integrated into enterprise workflows through automated file transfers, using scripting or APIs. It also plays a key role in cloud backup and disaster recovery, ensuring that files are securely transferred and stored in cloud environments, which supports business continuity.

However, businesses must address certain implementation challenges. Despite its secure design, Cloud-Based Secure File Transfer is not immune to risks such as misconfigured SSH keys, improper access control, or inadequate encryption.

Regular security audits and careful configuration management are necessary to minimize the risk of data breaches. Additionally, integrating Cloud-Based Secure File Transfer with legacy systems can present challenges, such as incompatible APIs or outdated authentication methods.

== Comparisons with related technologies ==
Cloud-Based Secure File Transfer differs from traditional SFTP primarily in its deployment and management model. Traditional SFTP services are typically hosted on-premises or on virtual servers, requiring manual configuration, ongoing infrastructure maintenance, and security management by in-house IT teams. In contrast, Cloud-Based Secure File Transfer is offered as a Software-as-a-Service (SaaS) service, reducing infrastructure overhead by eliminating the need for dedicated hardware or virtual machines. This model simplifies management through centralized web-based interfaces, automated updates, and built-in scalability.

While Cloud-Based Secure File Transfer is focused on providing secure file transfers over the SFTP protocol, Managed File Transfer (MFT) platforms generally support a broader range of protocols, including FTP, FTPS, HTTP/S, and AS2. MFT services often include advanced features such as end-to-end encryption, extensive automation, compliance reporting, and integration with enterprise systems. Cloud-Based Secure File Transfer services may offer some of these features but are typically more lightweight and streamlined, targeting organizations seeking a secure and scalable alternative to traditional SFTP without the full suite of MFT capabilities. As such, Cloud-Based Secure File Transfer can be seen as a specialized subset within the broader managed file transfer ecosystem.

== See also ==
- SSH File Transfer Protocol (SFTP)
- Managed File Transfer (MFT)
- Secure Shell (SSH)
- Cloud Computing
- FTP Server
