= R66 =

R66 may refer to:

- R66 (South Africa), a road
- HD 268835, a star
- HMS Zambesi (R66), a destroyer of the Royal Navy
- R66: Repeated exposure may cause skin dryness or cracking, a risk phrase
- R66 Protocol, a file transfer protocol
- Robinson R66, a helicopter
- Small nucleolar RNA R66
