= Waarp =

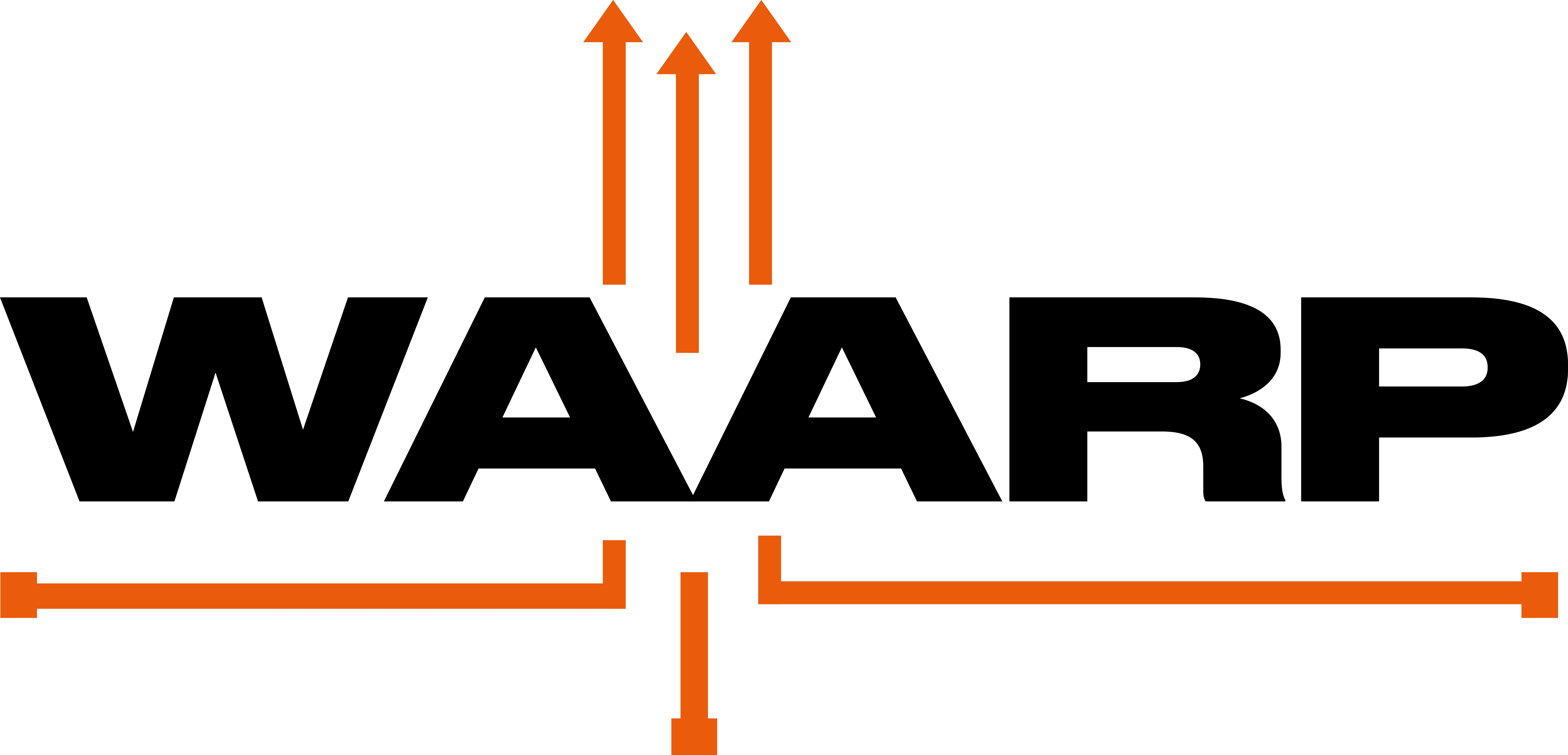

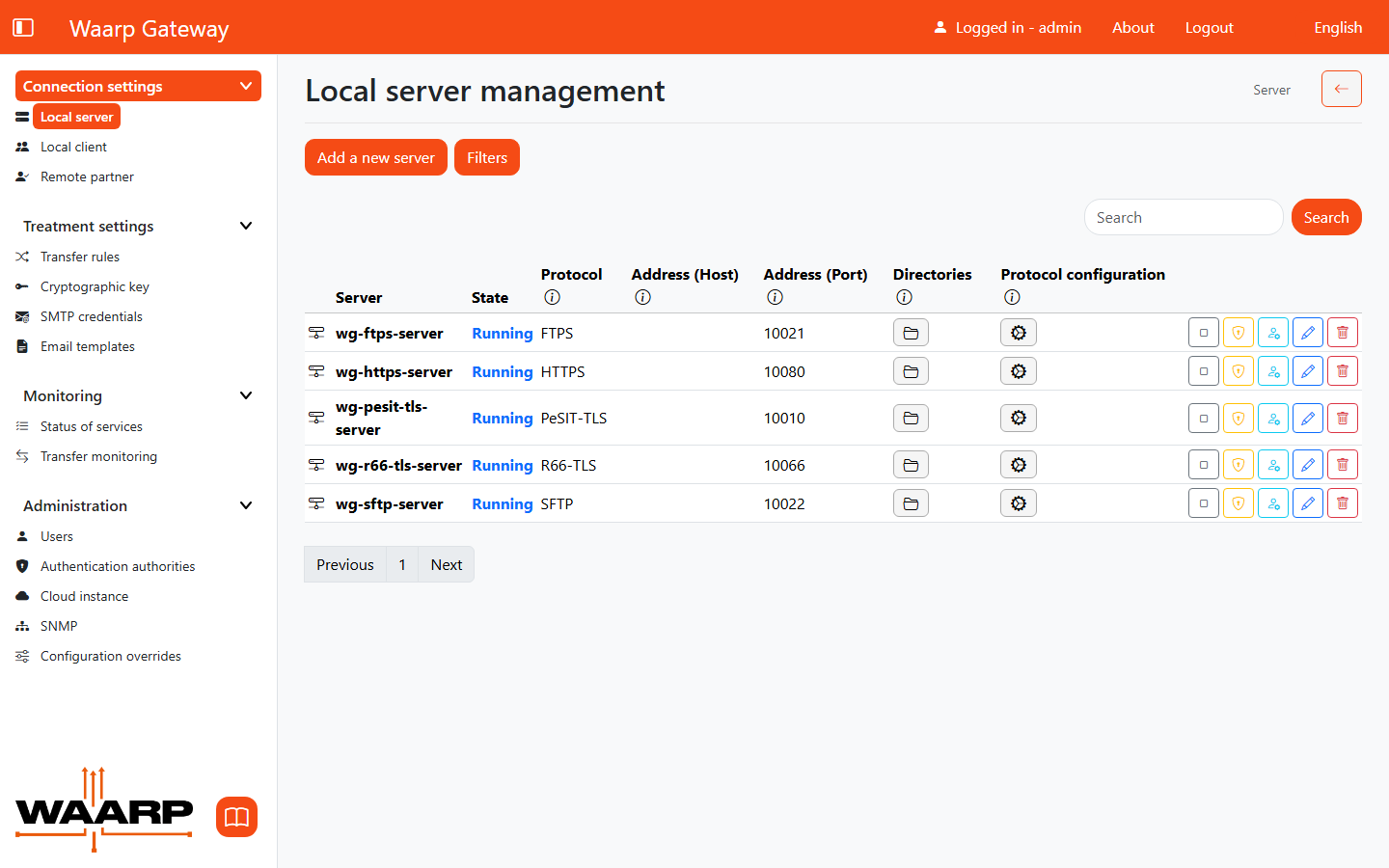
- Developer: Waarp (company)
- Release: 2006; 20 years ago
- Written in: Go (historically Java)
- Operating system: Linux, Windows
- Type: Managed file transfer
- License: GPLv3
- Website: www.waarp.fr
- Repository: code.waarp.fr

Waarp is an open-source managed file transfer (MFT) software suite, and the name of the French company that develops it. The suite is used to secure, monitor and automate file exchanges between information systems, and is distributed under the GPLv3 license.

== History ==
The project originated in 2006 around an open transfer protocol named R66, designed to guarantee data integrity and the automatic recovery of interrupted transfers. An early version was deployed in French public administrations and has been in production since 2007. The software was first written in Java. It was later rewritten in Go, distributed as a single dependency-free binary.

The Waarp company maintains the code base, manages the product roadmap and provides professional support, while the software remains free and open source. Waarp is listed in the French government's free-software catalogue (SILL).

== Components ==
The suite is made up of three complementary products.

=== Waarp Transfer ===
A file-transfer agent for internal flows, based on the R66 protocol. It provides checkpoint/restart of interrupted transfers, file-integrity checks before and after transfer, and the execution of pre- and post-processing tasks.

=== Waarp Gateway ===
A multi-protocol gateway designed to exchange files with external partners, supporting SFTP, FTP/S, HTTP/S, PeSIT, WebDAV and AS2, as well as the R66 protocol. It performs protocol conversion between internal and external exchanges.

=== Waarp Manager ===
A web-based administration console for centralised configuration, real-time monitoring of flows and role-based access control across the deployed agents.

== R66 protocol ==
R66 is the open transfer protocol developed by the project. It is transactional (the failure of any step fails the whole transfer), supports TLS encryption and several authentication levels, and performs per-block and end-to-end integrity checks.

== Licensing and business model ==
Waarp Gateway and Waarp Transfer are released under the GPLv3 license, with the full source code publicly available. The company follows a professional open-source model: the software is free of licensing fees, and revenue comes from technical support, integration services and training.

== Recognition ==
Waarp was featured as an OW2 "Project of the Month".

== See also ==
- Managed file transfer
- Comparison of file transfer protocols
