= ZMax =

ZMax is a file transfer protocol developed in 1990-1991 by Mike Bryeans (Micro TECH Systems) who also developed TMODEM.

Zmax is designed to replace ZMODEM. It uses 32 bit CRC's on file data blocks, the same as Zmodem, and 32 bit CRC's on its information blocks where Zmodem uses 16 bit.

In stream mode Zmax sends blocks, the size being set by the receiver, of data but doesn't require ACKs from the receiver.

Zmax should (depending on equipment, phone lines, implementation, etc.) allow about 97.5 percent efficiency at 2400 baud on a 30K file compared to Zmodem's 95 percent. Unlike Zmodem, Zmax reaches full speed on considerably smaller files. In fact, due to less overhead associated with small files, it achieves a better efficiency rating.

In Non-Stream mode (which can be set by the receiver or the sender), Zmax is a super Batch XMODEM or YMODEM depending on the block size, because it uses 32 bit CRCs instead of 16.

Unlike Zmodem which sets an upper limit of 1024 bytes on block sizes, Zmax has an upper limit of over 32K. Because of this, Zmax may be used as a mailer protocol without any modifications.

Zmax also has a lot less CPU overhead than Zmodem, so slower computers can drive highspeed modems faster. Zmax does not encode each byte of data like Zmodem does. This reduces the amount of CPU overhead and simplifies the code quite a bit. Zmax also treats all files as binary 8 bit files and will require word length to be set to 8, which is the most common setting.
