= EFTP =

Network protocol for file transfer

EFTP was a very simple file transfer protocol developed as part of the PARC Universal Packet protocol suite at Xerox PARC in the late 1970s. It was the inspiration for the Trivial File Transfer Protocol (TFTP) in the TCP/IP suite.

As with its descendant, TFTP, it did not use the reliable byte stream protocol of the suite (Byte Stream Protocol in the case of PUP); rather, it ran directly on top of the basic internetwork layer. (An early version of EFTP ran on top of bare Ethernet packets.) Also, like TFTP, it was a simple lock-step protocol; there was only ever one packet outstanding at any time, and every packet received by either party caused one packet to be sent in reply (until the termination of the transfer). Unlike TFTP, it made no provisions for sending the file-name as part of transfers, so it could only be used either in places that didn't need a file name (as with spooling), or in conjunction with another protocol that provided the file-name (as in booting).

Since EFTP was so simple, it was easy to implement in a very small amount of memory, an important consideration at that time. It was used for booting Xerox Altos over the Ethernet, and also to send files to the print spoolers of laser printers.

Various expansions of the initialism EFTP have been given, including Easy File Transfer Protocol, Ether File Transfer Protocol, and Experimental File Transfer Protocol.

== Notes ==
- Ed Taft, Spruce Protocols (Xerox PARC, Palo Alto, June 1979)
- Ed Taft, David Boggs, Alto Boot Protocol (Xerox PARC, Palo Alto, February 1979)
- John Shoch, EFTP: A PUP-based Ether File Transfer Protocol (Xerox PARC, Palo Alto, June 1976)
