= UFTP =

- Developer: Dennis Bush
- Release: July 6, 2001; 25 years ago
- Stable release: 5.0.4 / October 19, 2026
- Type: File transfer (multicast)
- License: GPLv3
- Website: uftp-multicast.sourceforge.net

The UDP-based File Transfer Protocol (UFTP) is a communication protocol designed to transfer files to multiple recipients. To accomplish this, UFTP multicasts the files to recipients via the User Datagram Protocol (UDP). The reference implementation of UFTP is open-source software distributed under the GNU General Public License Version 3. The author of UFTP and its reference protocol is Dennis Bush.

UFTP can perform effectively in a wide area network with high network delay, as well as in communication satellite transmissions.

Bush published a pre-release version of UFTP on July 6, 2001. After two more intermediate releases, version 1.0 was published on December 17, 2002. He based UFTP on the Multicast File Transfer Protocol (MFTP), which was designed and developed at Starburst Communications. In 1997 and 1998, Starburst had submitted drafts of the MFTP specification to the Internet Engineering Task Force, with a view to promoting adoption of the protocol. Starburst later sold MFTP, along with their Omnicast file distribution software, to the Fantastic Corporation. Stratacache, a digital signage company in the United States, announced in February 2004 that they had purchased the property from Fantastic.

== See also ==
- Comparison of file transfer protocols
- Point-to-multipoint communication
