= List of FTP server return codes =

FTP server return codes always have three digits, and each digit has a special meaning. The first digit denotes whether the response is good, bad or incomplete:

Range	Purpose
1xx	Positive Preliminary reply The requested action is being initiated; expect another reply before proceeding with a new command. (The user-process sending another command before the completion reply would be in violation of protocol; but server-FTP processes should queue any commands that arrive while a preceding command is in progress.) This type of reply can be used to indicate that the command was accepted and the user-process may now pay attention to the data connections, for implementations where simultaneous monitoring is difficult. The server-FTP process may send at most, one 1xx reply per command.
2xx	Positive Completion reply The requested action has been successfully completed. A new request may be initiated.
3xx	Positive Intermediate reply The command has been accepted, but the requested action is being held in abeyance, pending receipt of further information. The user should send another command specifying this information. This reply is used in command sequence groups.
4xx	Transient Negative Completion reply The command was not accepted and the requested action did not take place, but the error condition is temporary and the action may be requested again. The user should return to the beginning of the command sequence, if any. It is difficult to assign a meaning to "transient", particularly when two distinct sites (Server- and User-processes) have to agree on the interpretation. Each reply in the 4xx category might have a slightly different time value, but the intent is that the user-process is encouraged to try again. A rule of thumb in determining if a reply fits into the 4xx or the 5xx (Permanent Negative) category is that replies are 4xx if the commands can be repeated without any change in command form or in properties of the User or Server (e.g., the command is spelled the same with the same arguments used; the user does not change his file access or user name; the server does not put up a new implementation.)
5xx	Permanent Negative Completion reply The command was not accepted and the requested action did not take place. The User-process is discouraged from repeating the exact request (in the same sequence). Even some "permanent" error conditions can be corrected, so the human user may want to direct his User-process to reinitiate the command sequence by direct action at some point in the future (e.g., after the spelling has been changed, or the user has altered his directory status.)
6xx	Protected reply RFC 2228 introduced the concept of protected replies to increase security over FTP communications. The 6xx replies are Base64 encoded protected messages that serves as responses to secure commands. When properly decoded, these replies fall into the above categories.

The second digit is a grouping digit and encodes the following information:

Range	Purpose
x0x	Syntax These replies refer to syntax errors, syntactically correct commands that don't fit any functional category, unimplemented or superfluous commands.
x1x	Information These are replies to requests for information, such as status or help.
x2x	Connections Replies referring to the control and data connections.
x3x	Authentication and accounting Replies for the login process and accounting procedures.
x4x	Unspecified as of RFC 959.
x5x	File system These replies indicate the status of the Server file system vis-a-vis the requested transfer or other file system action.

Below is a list of all known return codes that may be issued by an FTP server.

Code	Explanation
100 Series	The requested action is being initiated, expect another reply before proceeding with a new command.
110	Restart marker replay . In this case, the text is exact and not left to the particular implementation; it must read: MARK yyyy = mmmm where yyyy is User-process data stream marker, and mmmm server's equivalent marker (note the spaces between markers and "=").
120	Service ready in nnn minutes.
125	Data connection already open; transfer starting.
150	File status okay; about to open data connection.
200 Series	The requested action has been successfully completed.
202	Command not implemented, superfluous at this site.
211	System status, or system help reply.
212	Directory status.
213	File status.
214	Help message. Explains how to use the server or the meaning of a particular non-standard command. This reply is useful only to the human user.
215	NAME system type. Where NAME is an official system name from the registry kept by IANA.
220	Service ready for new user.
221	Service closing control connection. Logged out if appropriate.
225	Data connection open; no transfer in progress.
226	Closing data connection. Requested file action successful (for example, file transfer or file abort).
227	Entering Passive Mode (h1,h2,h3,h4,p1,p2).
228	Entering Long Passive Mode (long address, port).
229	Entering Extended Passive Mode (|||port|).
230	User logged in, proceed.
232	User logged in, authorized by security data exchange.
234	Server accepts the security mechanism specified by the client; no security data needs to be exchanged.
235	Server accepts the security data given by the client; no further security data needs to be exchanged.
250	Requested file action was okay, completed.
300 Series	The command is not acceptable, but the requested action is on hold, pending receipt of further information.
331	User name okay, password needed.
332	No need account for login.
334	Server accepts the security mechanism specified by the client; some security data needs to be exchanged.
335	Server accepts the security data given by the client; more security data needs to be exchanged.
336	Username okay, password okay. Challenge is "....".
421	Service NOT available, closing control connection. This may be a reply to any command if the service knows it must shut down.
425	Can't open data connection.
426	Connection closed; transfer aborted.
430	Invalid username or password
431	Need some unavailable resource to process security.
434	Requested host unavailable.
450	Requested file action not taken. File unavailable (e.g., file busy).
451	Requested action aborted. Local error in processing.
452	Requested action not taken. Insufficient storage space in system.
500 Series	Syntax error, command unrecognized and the requested action did not take place. This may include errors such as command line too long.
501	Syntax error in parameters or arguments.
502	Command not implemented.
503	Bad sequence of commands.
504	Command not implemented for that parameter.
530	Not logged in.
532	Need account for storing files.
533	Command protection level denied for policy reasons.
534	Request denied for policy reasons.
535	Failed security check.
536	Data protection level not supported by security mechanism.
537	Command protection level not supported by security mechanism.
550	Requested action not taken. File unavailable (e.g., file not found, no access).
551	Requested action aborted. Page type unknown.
552	Requested file action aborted. Exceeded storage allocation (for current directory or dataset).
553	Requested action not taken. File name not allowed.
600 Series	Replies regarding confidentiality and integrity
631	Integrity protected reply.
632	Confidentiality and integrity protected reply.
633	Confidentiality protected reply.

== See also ==
- List of FTP commands
- List of HTTP status codes
