= Aspera (company) =

File transfer software company

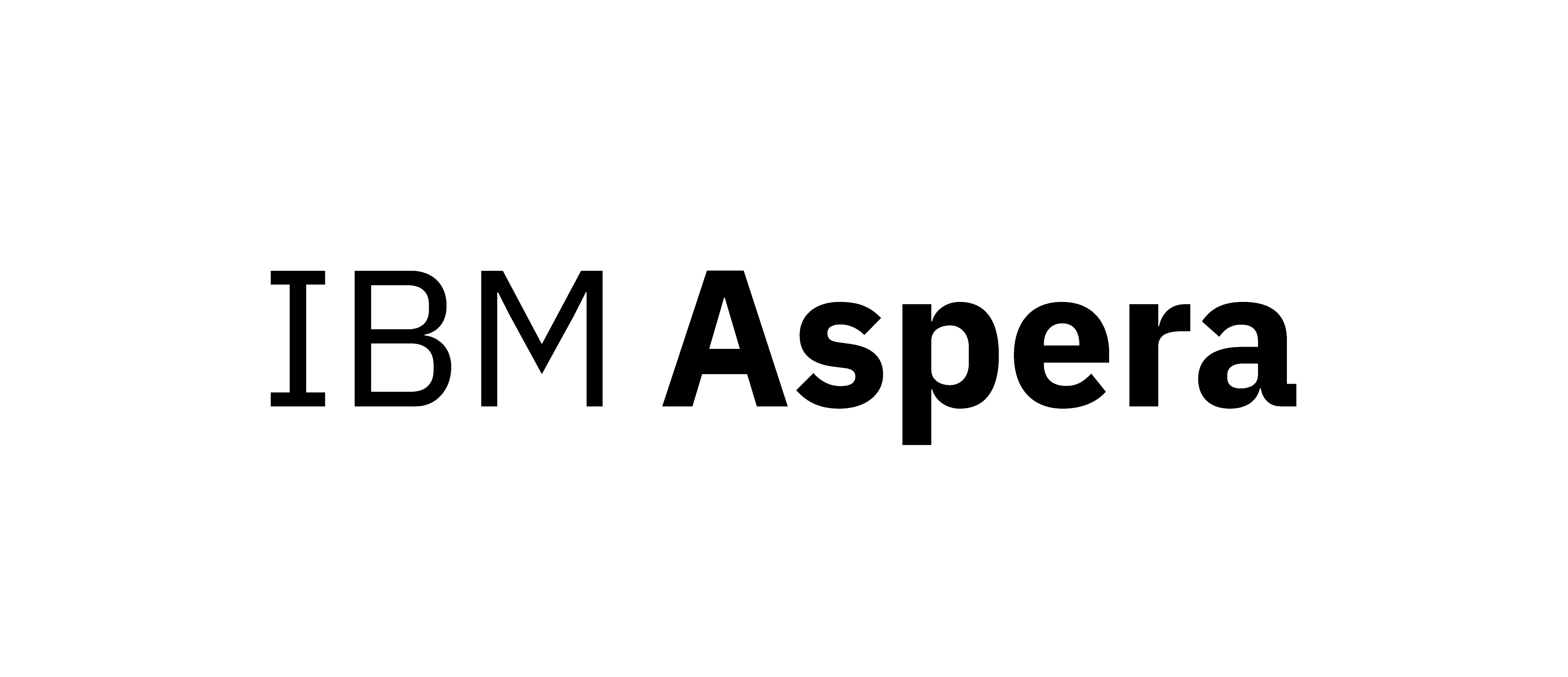
- Industry: Data transmission Streaming media
- Founded: 2004; 21 years ago
- Headquarters: 425 Market Street, San Francisco, California, U.S.
- Parent: IBM (2013–present)
- Website: ibm.com/aspera/

Aspera is a data transport and streaming technology company that provides high-speed data transfer services. Aspera belongs to the hybrid cloud business unit of IBM.

== History ==
Aspera was founded in 2004 by Michelle Munson and Serban Simu. Munson and Simu patented and Aspera developed FASP, a high-speed data transfer protocol, and software products based on FASP. IBM acquired Aspera in January 2014.

Aspera won a 2013 Primetime Engineering Emmy Award for Outstanding Achievement in Engineering Development and a 2014 Technology and Engineering Emmy Award for Secure Accelerated File Movement over IP including the Internet. The company received a Hollywood Professional Association (HPA) Engineering Excellence Award for its Telestream Vantage with Lightspeed Live Capture product in 2018.

== Patents ==
Aspera has been granted the following patents:

- 2005: Bulk data transfer technology.
- 2007: Methods and systems for aggregate bandwidth control.
- 2009: Practical models for high speed file delivery services, supporting guaranteed delivery times and differentiated service levels.
- 2010: Methods and systems for input and output driven rate adaptation.
- 2012: Multicast bulk transfer systems.
- 2015: Bulk data transfer and measuring the roundtrip time of requests and transmissions.

== See also ==
- List of mergers and acquisitions by IBM
