= File Service Protocol =

File Service Protocol (FSP) is a UDP-based replacement for the File Transfer Protocol, designed for anonymous access with lower hardware and network requirements than FTP. In particular, because it uses UDP, it avoids the problems that many FTP servers have had with requiring a separate process for each client, and because it is built to use an unreliable protocol, it can more easily handle resuming a transfer after a network failure.

== History ==
FSP never reached the popularity of FTP for legitimate use (although wuarchive and id Software provided FSP service in addition to FTP for some time), but became very popular in the early-to-mid-1990s for underground sites containing pornography and/or warez. Because an FSP server only requires one process (as opposed to one process per client for most FTP servers), it is much harder for a system administrator to notice it in a process list; also, since it uses UDP, it is less likely to be noticed by a network administrator.

Eventually, however, an increased use of firewalls, a decreasing usage of the shell accounts required to run a server or most of the clients, and a lack of FSP support in web browsers caused its use to taper off, and the warez scene moved to HTTP and FXP while pornography moved to publicly advertised web servers.

== Port number ==
As the FSP protocol is not officially recognized by IANA, it has no official port number. However, as a UDP equivalent of FTP, official FSP servers frequently run on UDP port 21, which is the same as FTP's TCP port number. Because FSP uses UDP and FTP uses TCP they can both run at same time on the same port number without conflict. Unofficial servers may run on any port, although 2121 was a popular choice. (On most *nix systems, only the root user can start a process that listens on a port under 1024.)

== Protocol name ==
The name FSP was originally created without a real expansion. In 1993, discussions were held about what to expand the acronym to; the ultimate result was File Service Protocol. Other suggestions included File Slurping Protocol, FTP's Sexier Partner, and Flaky Stream Protocol. Due to its inherent low performance, FSP was sometimes colloquially said to stand for "Fucking Slow Protocol" .
