= Sendfile =

In computing, sendfile is a command which can be found in a number of contexts relating to data transmission:

- Sendfile (Unix), a push-based asynchronous file transfer, regardless of whether local or remote, using the Simple Asynchronous File Transfer (SAFT), an Internet protocol bound to TCP port 487
- Sendfile (IBM VM), a command to transfer a file asynchronously from one VM/CMS user to another, regardless of whether local or remote
- Sendfile (system call), a system call
- As a command within an instant messaging application.
