= Small nucleolar RNA R66 =

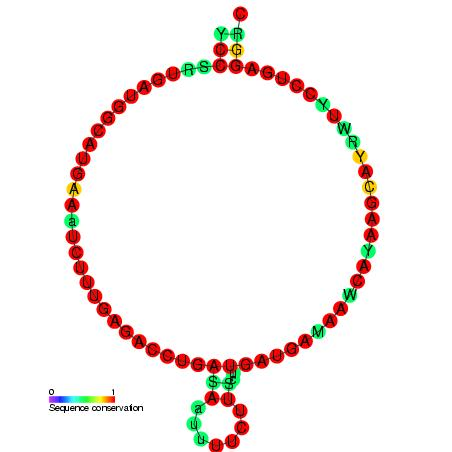
- Predicted secondary structure and sequence conservation of snoR66

Identifiers
- Symbol: snoR66
- Rfam: RF00202

Other data
- RNA type: Gene; snRNA; snoRNA; CD-box
- Domain: Eukaryota
- GO: GO:0006396 GO:0005730
- SO: SO:0000593
- PDB structures: PDBe

In molecular biology, Small nucleolar RNA R66 (also known as snoR66) is a non-coding RNA (ncRNA) molecule which functions in the modification of other small nuclear RNAs (snRNAs). This type of modifying RNA is usually located in the nucleolus of the eukaryotic cell which is a major site of snRNA biogenesis. It is known as a small nucleolar RNA (snoRNA) and also often referred to as a guide RNA.

snoR66 belongs to the C/D box class of snoRNAs which contain the conserved sequence motifs known as the C box (UGAUGA) and the D box (CUGA). Most of the members of the box C/D family function in directing site-specific 2'-O-methylation of substrate RNAs.

snoR66 was identified by a computational screening of the rice Oryza sativa genome and is proposed to acts as a methylation guide for 18S ribosomal RNA in plants. Rice snoR66 has also been alternatively named snoZ269. It should also not be confused with the snoRNA identified in yeast (Saccharomyces cerevisiae) and called snR66.
