= WU-FTPD =

FTP server software

- Developers: Chris Myers and Bryan D. O'Connor
- Operating system: Unix-like systems
- Type: FTP daemon
- License: WU-FTPD License
- Website: www.wu-ftpd.org

WU-FTPD (more fully wuarchive-ftpd, also frequently spelled in lowercase as wu-ftpd) is a free FTP server software (daemon) for Unix-like operating systems.

It was originally written by Chris Myers and Bryan D. O'Connor in Washington University in St. Louis as a replacement of the BSD FTP daemon, for use in the Washington University network, primarily the large wuarchive site. The software eventually evolved to lend itself as a replacement in other mainstream commercial operating systems of the time, including DEC's Ultrix, IBM's AIX and Sun's SunOS and Solaris operating systems. It was also soon ported to other operating systems rooted in open source, such as FreeBSD and Linux.

The software had fallen into disrepair during the mid-1990s until its stewardship was taken over by Stan O. Barber. He released a number of patches, which were named the ACADEM series, named after his company, Academ Consulting Services. After a few years the source code was taken over by Gregory Lundberg who consolidated the ACADEM and other patches and enhanced the software, again through another series of patches called the VR series, named after VRNet, his then company. Around 1999, the project's oversight was provided by a loose group of developers working as the WU-FTPD Development Group, which counted Gregory Lundberg among them. Around 2002, he left the project for personal reasons and it went dormant, with only Kent Landfield of the Landfield Group keeping the website and the CVS repository alive up until 2007. Today, a new series (CC) of unofficial patches was launched to try to bring the software up-to-date, again culling for patches found across the Internet.

BeroFTPD was also an offshoot of WU-FTPD, which saw feature improvements made into the code. The last known release of that software was 1.3.4 before it was merged back into the WU-FTPD codebase yielding wu-ftpd-2.6.0 as a result. BeroFTPD development then ceased.

Up until the early 2000s, it was the most common FTP server software in use, though its use has lessened in recent years due to availability of more feature-rich and easier-to-configure software, and primarily due to its perceived lack of security and the perceived complexity of the source code. In 2001, for example, the Ramen worm used WU-FTPD as one of the possible intrusion mechanisms.
