= MIME Object Security Services =

IETF security protocol

MIME Object Security Services (MOSS) is a protocol that uses the multipart/signed and multipart/encrypted framework to apply digital signature and encryption services to MIME objects.

== Details ==
The services are offered through the use of end-to-end cryptography between an originator and a recipient at the application layer. Asymmetric (public key) cryptography is used in support of the digital signature service and encryption key management. Symmetric (secret key) cryptography is used in support of the encryption service. The procedures are intended to be compatible with a wide range of public key management approaches, including both ad hoc and certificate-based schemes. Mechanisms are provided to support many public key management approaches.

== Spreading ==
MOSS was never widely deployed and is now abandoned, largely due to the popularity of PGP.
