= C-MODEM =

File transfer and protocol driver

C-Modem is a protocol driver developed by Lavio Pareschi (Rio de Janeiro) in 1989 that functions similarly to ZMODEM.

== Features ==
C-Modem has a crash recovery feature. If a transmission is interrupted, the partially received file is saved with the extension .BAD. Upon reconnection, the transmission resumes.

The protocol dynamically adjusts the size of data blocks between cyclic redundancy checks based on transmission speed and error rates. Block sizes can range from 32 to 4096 bytes. C-Modem also supports full duplex communication.
