= TMODEM =

TMODEM is a file transfer protocol developed in 1990 by Mike Bryeans of Micro TECH Systems. TMODEM is derived from the HTMS protocol Translink with special modifications so that it works well with BBS systems and terminal programs.
