= CCSDS File Delivery Protocol =

Protocol for transferring files from space to Earth

CCSDS File Delivery Protocol (CFDP) is a file transfer protocol for use in space, e.g. between Earth and spacecraft in Earth orbit or between Earth and spacecraft on interplanetary missions.

The protocol is defined by CCSDS active recommended standard 727.0-B-5. It is also available as ISO standard 17355:2007.
