= Managed file transfer =

Data transfer technology

Managed file transfer (MFT) is a technology that provides the secure transfer of data in an efficient and reliable manner. MFT software is marketed to companies as a more secure alternative to using insecure protocols like FTP (file transfer protocol) and HTTP to transfer files. By using an MFT solution, companies can avoid custom scripting and meet compliance requirements.

== Background ==
From its inception, FTP has made moving large volumes of bulk data between any two entities — including file servers, applications, and trading partners — possible. However, FTP (and other communication protocols such as HTTP and SMTP) do not, on their own, provide a way to secure or manage file transfers. Regardless of the lack of security and management capabilities, many companies have continued to transport large batches of structured and unstructured data using these protocols.

This practice is changing, however. According to Gartner Research, "Organizations of all sizes continue to invest in MFT platforms that enable secure and private transportation of files — across size and volume levels — internally and externally." MFT has also found a foothold among file transfer protocols and solutions because of its focus on facilitating the "transfer of large file sizes and volume."

MFT is often used by companies in the retail, banking, healthcare, manufacturing, telecommunication and insurance industries. Government public records and archives, open data, and interdepartmental data flows also heavily use MFT.

The global MFT market was estimated at US$1.3 billion in 2020 and is projected to reach US$2.4 billion by 2027.

== Features ==
While Managed File Transfer always covers the same features—reporting (e.g., notification of successful and unsuccessful file transfers), non-repudiation, audit trails, global visibility, automation of file transfer-related activities and processes, end-to-end security, and performance metrics/monitoring—the way it is used has a major impact on the nature of the appropriate solution. Gartner analysts agree on 4 different use cases for MFT:

1. Ad Hoc or file distribution
2. Systematic, enterprise-wide file transfer
3. Extreme or large file transfer
4. B2B file transfer

Core functionality also includes the ability to encrypt files in transit and at rest.

=== Typical MFT functionality ===
MFT centers on the secure and efficient transfer of data, but most MFT software solutions offer additional features. Typically, MFT software offers reporting (e.g., notification of successful file transfers), non-repudiation, audit trails, global visibility, the ability to automate file transfer-related activities and processes, end-to-end security, and performance metrics. MFT applications are available as both on-premises licensed software packages and software-as-a-service ("SaaS") solutions, and can often be used in hybrid cloud setups.

MFT applications are characterized by having all or most of the following features:

- Support multiple file transfer protocols including PeSIT, FTP/S, OFTP, SFTP, SCP, AS2 and HTTP/S.
- Securely transfer files over public and private networks using encrypted file transfer protocols.
- Securely store files using multiple data encryption methods.
- Automate file transfer processes between trading partners and exchanges, including detection and handling of failed file transfers.
- Authenticate users against existing user repositories such as LDAP and Active Directory.
- Integrate to existing applications using documented APIs (application programming interfaces).
- Generate detailed reports on user and file transfer activity.

=== Alternative definition of characteristics ===
One vendor in the description of their product identifies six issues with commercial use of FTP and even SFTP that Managed File Transfer seeks to address. The issues revolve around security weaknesses of traditional FTP in an increasing cyber threat environment and meeting increasing stringent regulatory compliance for data. While bespoke solutions may resolve some of these issues, MFT can address them with a standardized approach, along with the ability to be customized.

== See also ==
- Comparison of file transfer protocols
