= Abhay Bhushan =

Indian computer scientist (born 1944)

- Born: 23 November 1944 (age 81); Allahabad, United Provinces, British India
- Education: Indian Institute of Technology Kanpur; Massachusetts Institute of Technology; MIT Sloan School of Management
- Known for: File Transfer Protocol

Abhay Bhushan (Hindi pronunciation: [əbʰəj bʰuːʂəɳː]; born November 23, 1944) is an Indian computer scientist. Bhushan has been a major contributor to the development of the Internet TCP/IP architecture, and is the author of the File Transfer Protocol (which he started working on while he was a student at MIT) and the early versions of email standards. He is currently chairman of Asquare Inc., Secretary of Indians for Collective Action and the former President of the IIT-Kanpur Foundation. In 2023, he was inducted into the Internet Hall of Fame.

== Early life and career ==
Abhay Bhushan was born in Allahabad, Uttar Pradesh. Bhushan is a graduate of the first batch (1960–65) from the Indian Institute of Technology Kanpur, receiving a B.Tech. in electrical engineering. Subsequently, he studied at the Massachusetts Institute of Technology, where he received a Masters in electrical engineering together with a degree in Management from the MIT Sloan School of Management. At MIT, he drafted the now famous RFC 114 and worked on developing FTP and E-mail protocols for the ARPANet and subsequent Internet. In 1978 he was a Director at the Institute of Engineering and Rural Technology in Allahabad and was also a senior manager in Engineering and Development of Xerox where he was a founder and manager of the Xerox Environmental Leadership. He also was a co-founder of both the YieldUP International which in 1995 went public on NASDAQ and Portola Communications, which was bought by Netscape in 1997.
