= BiModem =

File transfer protocol

BiModem was one of the last file transfer protocols developed for use in bulletin board systems. It was created by Erik Labs, and was revolutionary for its day.

Unlike the predominant protocols of the day (XMODEM, YMODEM, ZMODEM), BiModem allowed BBS users to upload and download files at the same time. This resulted in significant time savings when a 1 megabyte file would take more than an hour to transfer, at 130 to 250 characters per second over a 1200 or 2400 bit/s modem. In addition, it had a chat feature. This would allow the user and the sysop to converse during the upload/download of files.

BiModem never received widespread acceptance. It had to be manually patched into both BBS and terminal emulator packages, and it was incompatible with some programs. It was released in the end of 1989, and before it saw widespread use, HS/Link was created which was easily added to BBSes and allowed for file lists and bidirectional transfers.

Part of the problem with BiModem is that very few sysops and users wanted to wade through the instructions. To simplify installation, a ZIP file with BiModem and a preconfigured shareware copy of ProComm with a batch file to run BiModem was created.

The final version (BiModem 1.25) was released in 1991.

In 1995 a program was released in Argentina called BiModem Pro 4.0. This was a user-modified version of BiModem 1.25 with some minor bugfixes.
