= John Shoch =

American computer scientist

John F. Shoch is an American computer scientist and venture capitalist who made significant contributions to the development of computer networking while at Xerox PARC, in particular to the development of the PARC Universal Protocol (PUP), an important predecessor of TCP/IP.

His contributions were significant enough to warrant including his name on the memorial plaque at Stanford University commemorating the "Birth of the Internet."

== Career ==
Shoch attended Stanford, where he earned a B.A. in political science (1971); he later went on to earn an M.S. (1977) and a Ph.D. (1979) in Computer Science from Stanford as well. His Ph.D. thesis was entitled "Design and Performance of Local Computer Networks".

He joined Xerox in 1971, working at PARC, where his research interests included internetwork protocols, computer local area networks (in particular the Ethernet, which he helped develop), packet radio, programming languages, and various other aspects of distributed systems. His best-known work from that period, after the Ethernet and PUP, is on network worms; although the most famous incident involves one that ran out of control, they were actually early experiments in distributed computing over a network of loosely coupled machines.

In 1980, he became the assistant to the CEO of Xerox and director of the Corporate Policy Committee. In 1982, he moved on to become president of Xerox's Office Systems Division, which developed network-based office systems derived from research performed at PARC.

He left Xerox to become a venture capitalist with Asset Management Associates in 1985, and then became a founding general partner at Alloy Ventures in 1996.

He has also taught at Stanford University, is a member of the ACM and the IEEE, and serves as a trustee for the Computer History Museum.

== Publications ==
- David R. Boggs, John F. Shoch, Edward A. Taft, Robert M. Metcalfe, "Pup: An Internetwork Architecture", IEEE Transactions on Communications, Volume COM-28, Number 4, April, 1980, pp. 612–624.
- John Shoch, "A note on Inter-Network Naming, Addressing, and Routing", IEN-19, 1978.
- John Shoch, Jon Hupp, "The 'Worm' Programs - Early Experience with a Distributed Computation", Communications of the ACM, Volume 25, Number 3, March 1982, pp. 172–180. This paper has the unusual distinction of being cited by authors on a science fiction television program: Star Cops, episode #3 "Intelligent Listening for Beginners".
- John Shoch, Yogen Dalal, R.C. Crane, and David D. Redell, "Evoluation of the Ethernet Local Computer Network", IEEE Computer Magazine 15(8), 10-27, August 1982.

== See also ==
- History of the Internet
- Internet pioneers
