= Tsunami UDP Protocol =

UDP-based network file transfer protocol

The Tsunami UDP Protocol is a UDP-based protocol that was developed for high-speed file transfer over network paths that have a high bandwidth-delay product. Such protocols are needed because standard TCP does not perform well over paths with high bandwidth-delay products. Tsunami was developed at the Advanced Network Management Laboratory of Indiana University. Tsunami effects a file transfer by chunking the file into numbered blocks of 32 kilobyte. Communication between the client and server applications flows over a low bandwidth TCP connection, and the bulk data is transferred over UDP.
