= File transfer =

Transmission of computer files

File transfer is the transmission of a computer file through a communication channel from one computer system to another. Typically, file transfer is mediated by a communications protocol. In the history of computing, numerous file transfer protocols have been designed for different contexts.

== Protocols ==
A file transfer protocol is a convention that describes how to transfer files between two computing endpoints. As well as the stream of bits from a file stored as a single unit in a file system, some may also send relevant metadata such as the filename, file size and timestamp – and even file-system permissions and file attributes.

Some examples:

- FTP is an older cross-platform file transfer protocol
- SSH File Transfer Protocol a file transfer protocol secured by the Secure Shell (SSH) protocol
- Secure copy (scp) is based on the Secure Shell (SSH) protocol
- HTTP can support file transfer
- BitTorrent, Gnutella and other distributed file transfers systems use peer-to-peer
- In Systems Network Architecture, LU 6.2 Connect:Direct and XCOM Data Transport are traditionally used to transfer files
- Many instant messaging or LAN messenger systems support the ability to transfer files
- Computers may transfer files to peripheral devices such as USB flash drives
- Dial-up modems null modem links used XMODEM, YMODEM, ZMODEM and similar

== See also ==
- File sharing
- Managed file transfer
- Peer-to-peer file sharing
- Pull technology
- Push technology
- Sideloading
- WeTransfer
- Smash
