= List of tallest buildings in Amsterdam =

Skyline of Amsterdam
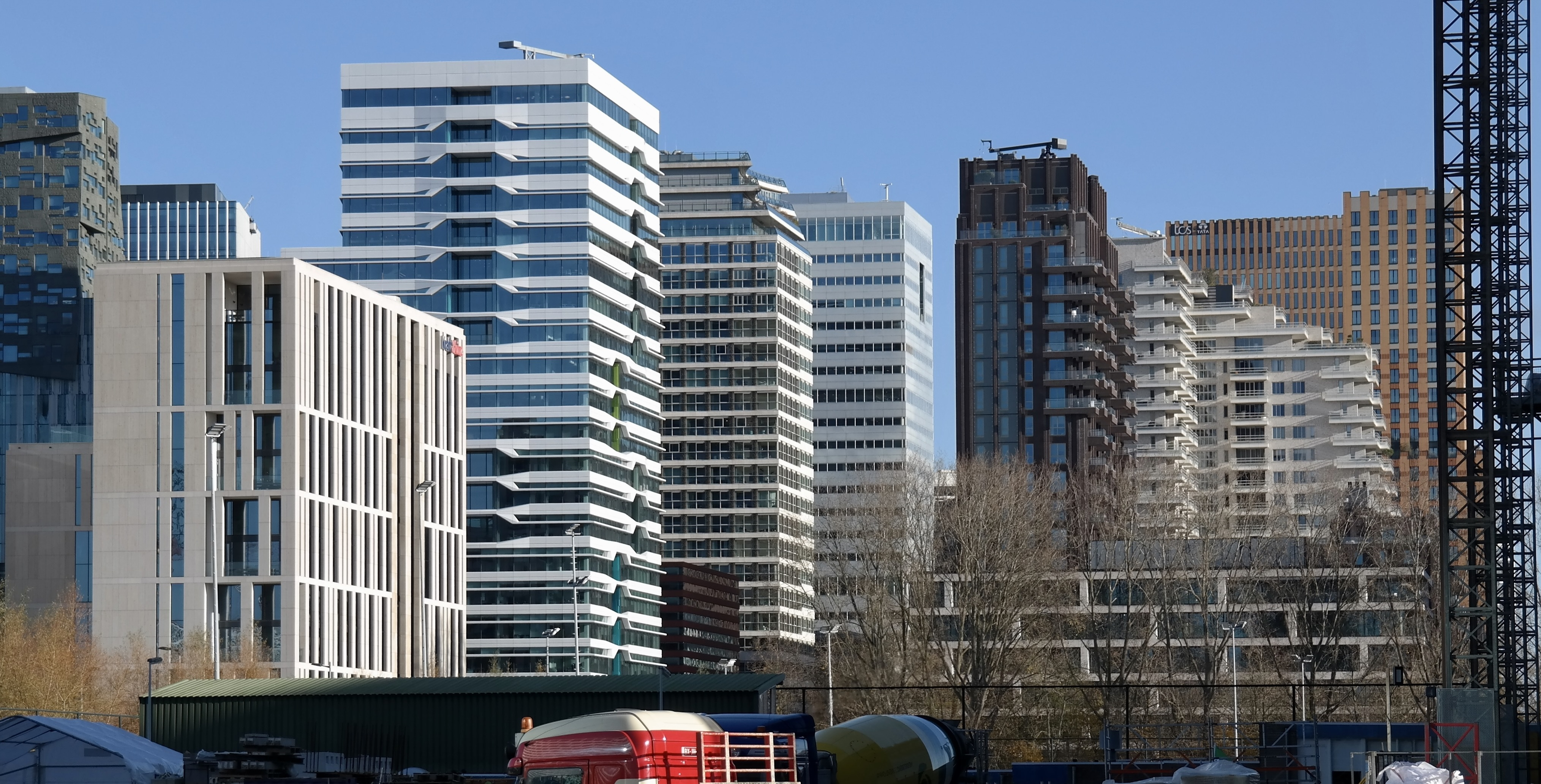
- The business district of Zuidas in 2021
- Tallest building: Rembrandt Tower (2007)
- Tallest building height: 150 m (492 ft)
- Major clusters: Zuidas, Omval, Overhoeks, Teleport, Bullewijk

Number of tall buildings (2026)
- Taller than 50 m (164 ft): 211
- Taller than 75 m (246 ft): 50
- Taller than 100 m (328 ft): 11
- Taller than 150 m (492 ft): 1

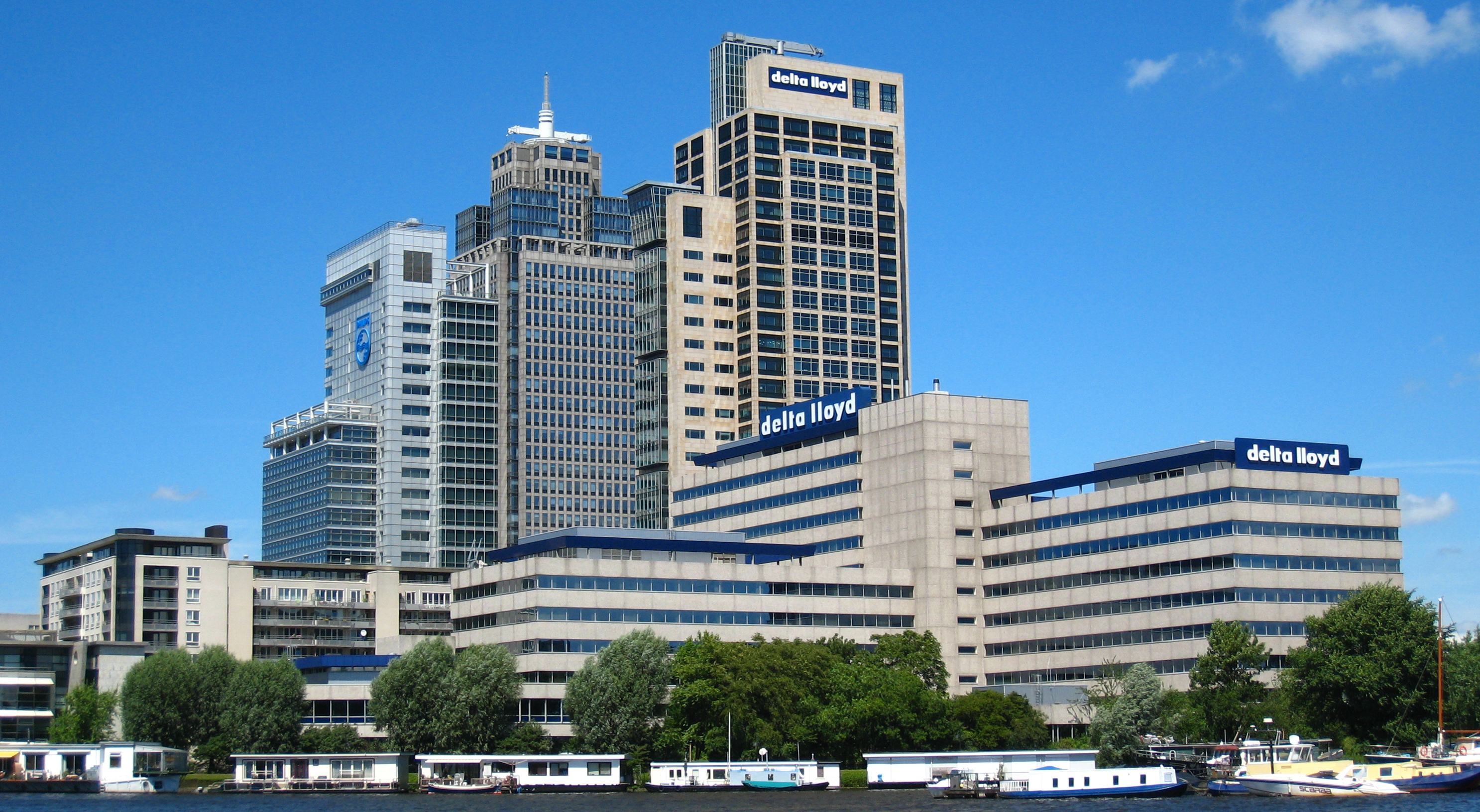
Omval contains Amsterdam's tallest building, Rembrandt Tower, which is named after Dutch Golden Age painter Rembrandt

Amsterdam is the capital and largest city in the Netherlands, with a population of 933,680 in 2024, and 2.5 million in its metropolitan area. The city is home to 50 buildings taller than 75 m (246 ft), 11 of which are greater than 100 m (328 ft) in height as of 2026. For both height categories, Amsterdam has the second most tall buildings in the Netherlands, after Rotterdam. While historically a predominantly a city of mid-rise buildings, Amsterdam has seen an increasing number of high-rises in the 21st century, due to the city's housing shortage and high land prices. The tallest building in Amsterdam is the 150 m (492 ft) Rembrandt Tower, an office building completed in 1995 in the Omval neighbourhood, in the eastern district of Amsterdam-Oost.

Amsterdam's city centre, ringed by its historic canals, is recognized as an World Heritage Site. Unlike in Rotterdam, The Hague, Utrecht, or Eindhoven, height restrictions ensure the city centre is mostly devoid of high-rises. Instead, Amsterdam has numerous high-rise clusters outside of the city centre. The largest cluster is the Zuidas business district, in the southern district of Amsterdam-Zuid, which arose in the 1990s and 2000s. Notable developments there include the World Trade Center complex, Amsterdam Symphony, and Valley. Omval has the city's tallest building, Rembrandt Tower, and second tallest building, Mondriaan Tower. Alongside Breitnertoren, they make up a trio of buildings named after famous Dutch painters.

Directly north of the city cenre is the neighbourhood of Overhoeks, named after the Overhoeks Tower completed there in 1971. Since the 2000s, it has been undergoing redevelopment. In the 2020s, a high-rise cluster has been constructed around the original tower, which was renamed A'DAM in 2016. This includes Amsterdam's third-tallest building, Maritim Congress Hotel. Teleport, in the city's northwest, is another business district with several high-rises, the tallest of which is the 98 m (320 ft) Millennium Tower. A smaller cluster, developed in the 2010s, surrounds the Noord metro station in the city's north.

Bullewijk, in Amsterdam's far southeast, contains numerous high-rise buildings near Johan Cruyff Arena, the home stadium of football club AFC Ajax. Bullewijk is undergoing significant growth; currently under construction in the area is Dreeftoren, which would become Amsterdam's third-tallest building upon completion; the two-tower The Ensemble development; and SPOT Amsterdam, a mixed-use multi-tower project. Other locations in Amsterdam with a concentration of high-rise buildings include the city's Eastern Docklands, NDSM, Oostenburg, and the University of Amsterdam. The Sluisbuurt neighbourhood, also under construction, will host yet another high-rise cluster.

== History ==
Number of high-rise buildings by height in Amsterdam by the end of each year, based on the list below. Click on the legend to toggle a specific height on or off. Free-standing structures such as church spires are not included. View chart definition.

== Cityscape ==
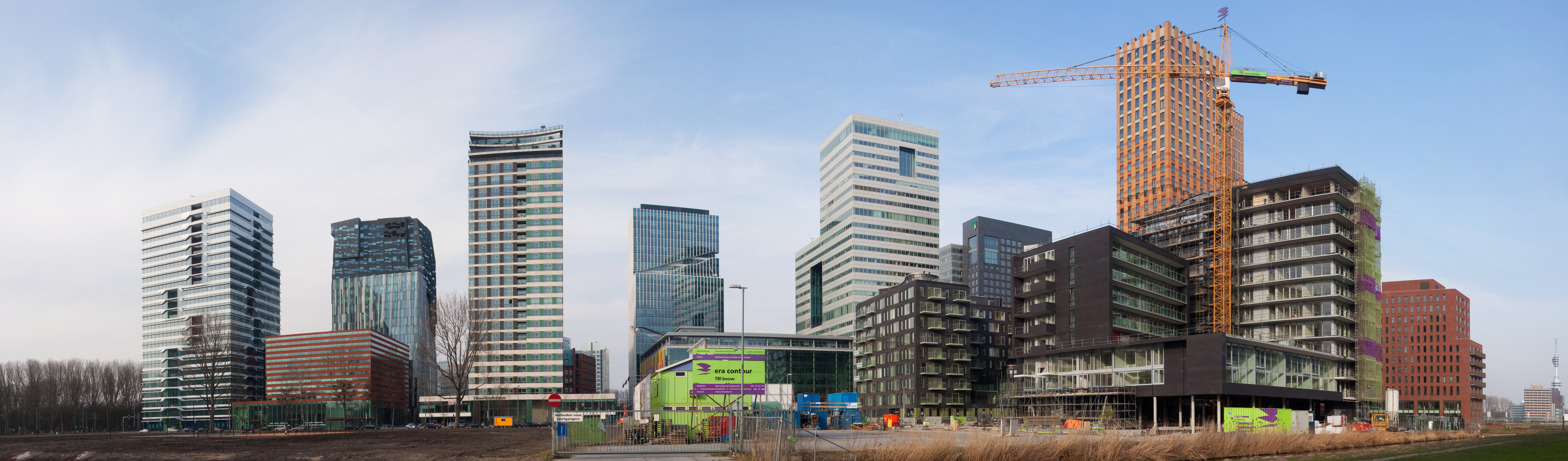
Zuidas in 2011. The orange Amsterdam Symphony towers (right) are among the tallest buildings in the cluster.

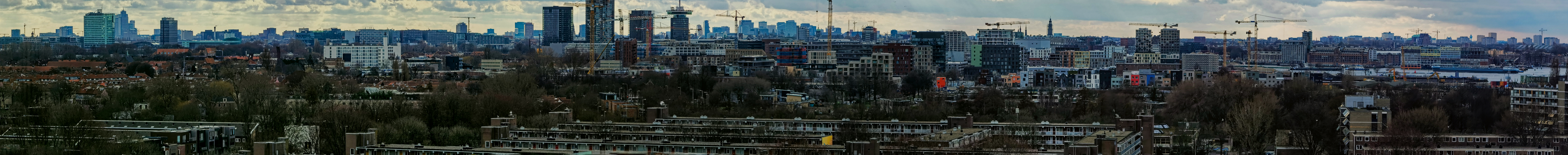
A wide panorama taken in 2023 from Amsterdam-Noord.

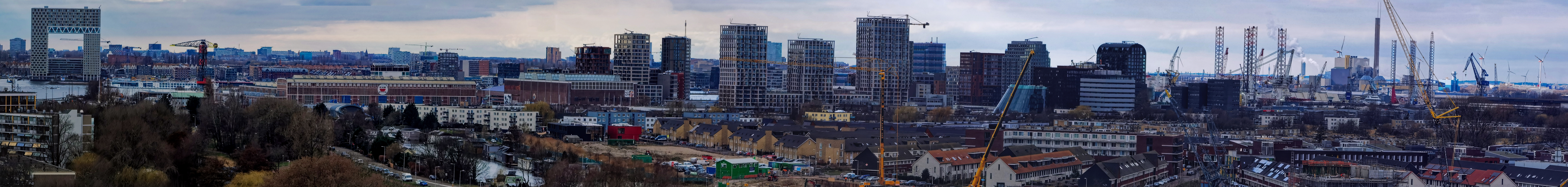
The western side of the panorama, showing the arch-shaped Pontsieger (far left) and the new cluster of buildings at NDSM (centre)

== Map of tallest buildings ==
The following map shows the distribution of buildings taller than 75 m (246 ft) in Amsterdam. Each marker is coloured by the decade of completion. For buildings outside the clusters named below, they are named and numbered by their height rank. Buildings inside the clusters are numbered in further maps below.

Buildings taller than 75 m (246 ft) in Amsterdam.
- 1960s
- 1970s
- 1980s
- 1990s
- 2000s
- 2010s
- 2020s
10 Justus
25 Pontsteiger
27 UP
42 Okura Hotel
44 Ruby Emma
46 De Nederlandsche Bank
50 Gare du Nord

=== Zuidas ===
Buildings taller than 75 m (246 ft) in Zuidas
- 1960s
- 1970s
- 1980s
- 1990s
- 2000s
- 2010s
- 2020s
5 ABN Amro 1
6 World Trade Center Tower H
7 Amsterdam Symphony I
8 Amsterdam Symphony II
11 Ito-toren
12 Valley North Tower
17 Viñoly
20 The Pulse 1
21 nhow Amsterdam RAI Hotel
22 The Rock
24 Intermezzo
28 Cross Towers
31 New Amsterdam
32 UN Studio Tower
33 The Pulse 2
34 Vivaldigebouw
35 Valley South Tower
37 Hourglass
38 WTC Amsterdam Tower Ten
41 Stepstone
43 900 Mahler
45 INNSiDE by Meliá
49 Xavier

=== Other clusters ===
Omval
Buildings taller than 75 m (246 ft).
- 1990s
- 2000s
- 2010s
1 Rembrandt Tower
2 Mondriaan Tower
9 Amstel Tower
15 Breitnertoren

Teleport
Buildings taller than 75 m (246 ft).
- 1990s
- 2000s
- 2020s
14 Millennium Tower
16 Crystal Tower
23 La Guardia Plaza 4
26 Crossroads 1
29 Belastingdienst
40 Vertical East

Overhoeks
Buildings taller than 75 m (246 ft).
- 1970s
- 2010s
- 2020s
3 Maritim Congress Hotel
4 Yvie
18 A'DAM
39 Bold
48 B-Mine

Bullewijk
Buildings taller than 75 m (246 ft).
- 2000s
13 Hazel
19 Oval Tower
30 Alpha Tower
36 Zuidoost Toren B
47 De Entree 230-260

== Tallest buildings ==
This list ranks completed buildings in Amsterdam that stand at least 75 m (246 ft) tall as of 2026, based on standard height measurement. This includes spires and architectural details but does not include antenna masts. The "Year" column indicates the year of completion. Buildings tied in height are sorted by year of completion with earlier buildings ranked first, and then alphabetically.

Was the tallest building in Amsterdam upon completion

Rank	Name	Image	Location	Height m (ft)	Floors	Year	Purpose	Notes
1	Rembrandt Tower		Omval 52°20′42″N 4°55′02″E	150 (492)	35	1995	Office	Tallest building in Amsterdam and in the Netherlands outside Rotterdam. Tallest building completed in Amsterdam in the 1990s.
2	Mondriaan Tower		Omval 52°20′39″N 4°55′03″E	123 (404)	31	2002	Office	Tallest building completed in Amsterdam in the 2000s.
3	Maritim Congress Hotel		Overhoeks 52°23′05″N 4°54′16″E	114 (374)	35	2024	Hotel	Tallest building completed in Amsterdam in the 2020s.
4	Yvie		Overhoeks 52°23′07″N 4°54′17″E	106.7 (350)	32	2025	Residential	Preliminarily known as Overhoeks Residential Tower.
5	ABN Amro 1		Zuidas 52°20′16″N 4°52′29″E	105 (344)	24	1999	Office	
6	World Trade Center Tower H		Zuidas 52°20′24″N 4°52′21″E	105 (344)	27	2004	Office	
7	Amsterdam Symphony I		Zuidas 52°20′10″N 4°52′25″E	105 (344)	29	2009	Residential	
8	Amsterdam Symphony II		Zuidas 52°20′11″N 4°52′27″E	105 (344)	27	2009	Office	
9	Amstel Tower		Omval 52°20′44″N 4°55′08″E	103 (338)	32	2018	Mixed-use	
10	Justus		Sluisbuurt 52°22′34″N 4°57′40″E	102 (335)	32	2024	Residential	
11	Ito-toren		Zuidas 52°20′13″N 4°52′23″E	100 (328)	25	2005	Office	
12	Valley North Tower		Zuidas 52°20′17″N 4°52′40″E	99.7 (327)	29	2021	Mixed-use	Mixed-use residential and office building.
13	Hazel		Bullewijk 52°18′27″N 4°56′49″E	99 (325)	28	2025	Residential	
14	Millennium Tower		Teleport 52°23′36″N 4°50′14″E	97.5 (320)	24	2004	Office	
15	Breitnertoren		Omval 52°20′40″N 4°55′00″E	95 (312)	22	2001	Office	Also known as Breitner Center.
16	Crystal Tower		Teleport 52°23′28″N 4°50′13″E	95 (312)	27	2002	Office	
17	Viñoly		Zuidas 52°20′16″N 4°52′20″E	95 (312)	24	2005	Office	
18	A'DAM		Overhoeks 52°23′02″N 4°54′08″E	94 (308)	22	1971	Mixed-use	Originally built as an office building to a height of 78.3 m (257 ft) in 1971. In 2016, a renovation increased the height to 94 m (308 ft). The building was renamed, and hotel space introduced.
19	Oval Tower		Bullewijk 52°18′44″N 4°56′24″E	94 (308)	24	2001	Office	
20	The Pulse 1		Zuidas 52°20′15″N 4°52′00″E	94 (308)	24	2024	Office	
21	nhow Amsterdam RAI Hotel		Zuidas 52°20′18″N 4°53′27″E	91 (299)	25	2020	Hotel	
22	The Rock		Zuidas 52°20′16″N 4°52′12″E	90.7 (298)	24	2007	Office	
23	La Guardia Plaza 4		Teleport 52°23′26″N 4°50′25″E	90 (295)	23	2004	Office	
24	Intermezzo		Zuidas 52°20′11″N 4°52′20″E	90 (295)	24	2017	Residential	
25	Pontsteiger		Houthaven 52°23′35″N 4°53′10″E	90 (295)	26	2018	Residential	Tallest building in Houthaven.
26	Crossroads 1	–	Teleport 52°23′14″N 4°50′12″E	90 (295)	28	2025	Residential	
27	UP		Eastern Docklands 52°22′40″N 4°54′59″E	88 (289)	19	2002	Office	Tallest building in the Eastern Docklands.
28	Cross Towers		Zuidas 52°20′16″N 4°53′06″E	87 (285)	23	2007	Office	Also known as Ernst & Young or Drenthestaete III.
29	Belastingdienst		Teleport 52°23′16″N 4°50′36″E	85 (279)	19	1994	Office	
30	Alpha Tower		Bullewijk 52°18′42″N 4°56′23″E	85 (279)	22	2000	Office	Also known as Zuidoost Toren A.
31	New Amsterdam		Zuidas 52°20′14″N 4°52′16″E	85 (279)	24	2007	Residential	
32	UN Studio Tower		Zuidas 52°20′13″N 4°52′10″E	85 (279)	21	2010	Office	
33	The Pulse 2		Zuidas 52°20′15″N 4°51′54″E	85 (279)	22	2024	Residential	
34	Vivaldigebouw		Zuidas 52°20′13″N 4°53′10″E	81.3 (267)	21	2019	Office	Headquarters of the European Medicines Agency. Also known as EMA Office Amsterdam.
35	Valley South Tower		Zuidas 52°20′14″N 4°52′40″E	79.6 (261)	23	2021	Mixed-use	Mixed-use residential and office building.
36	Zuidoost Toren B		Bullewijk 52°18′43″N 4°56′27″E	80 (262)	18	2002	Office	Also known as De Entree 230-.
37	Hourglass		Zuidas 52°20′15″N 4°52′04″E	80 (262)	19	2020	Mixed-use	Mixed-use hotel and office building.
38	WTC Amsterdam Tower Ten	–	Zuidas 52°20′25″N 4°52′35″E	80 (262)	21	2024	Office	
39	Bold		Overhoeks 52°23′07″N 4°54′20″E	79 (259)	24	2021	Residential	
40	Vertical East	–	Teleport 52°23′12″N 4°50′07″E	79 (259)	22	2022	Residential	
41	Stepstone		Zuidas 52°20′14″N 4°51′50″E	79 (259)	22	2024	Residential	
42	Okura Hotel		Nieuwe Pijp 52°20′56″N 4°53′38″E	78 (256)	22	1971	Hotel	
43	900 Mahler		Zuidas 52°20′11″N 4°52′13″E	77 (253)	22	2016	Residential	
44	Ruby Emma	–	Omval 52°20′18″N 4°55′16″E	76 (249)	23	2017	Hotel	
45	INNSiDE by Meliá		Zuidas 52°20′24″N 4°52′16″E	76 (249)	19	2020	Hotel	Originally built in the 1980s or 1992 at a lower height of 64 m (210 ft).
46	De Nederlandsche Bank		Frederiksplein 52°21′32″N 4°54′02″E	75 (246)	14	1968	Office	
47	De Entree 230-260	–	Bullewijk 52°18′36″N 4°56′28″E	75 (246)	17	2002	Office	also known as Entree II.
48	B-Mine		Overhoeks 52°23′05″N 4°54′12″E	75 (246)	24	2017	Residential	
49	Xavier		Zuidas 52°20′11″N 4°52′32″E	75 (246)	22	2019	Residential	
50	Gare du Nord	–	Elzenhagen 52°24′11″N 4°55′51″E	75 (246)	22	2022	Mixed-use	

== Tallest under construction or proposed ==
=== Under construction ===
The following table ranks buildings under construction in Amsterdam that are expected to be at least 75 m (246 ft) tall as of 2026, based on standard height measurement. The “Year” column indicates the expected year of completion. Buildings that are on hold are not included.

Building	Height m (ft)	Floors	Year	Purpose	Notes
Dreeftoren	133 (436)	40	2026	Residential	
The Ensemble 1	119 (390)	35	2026	Mixed-use	Mixed-use residential and office.
Crystal	108 (354)	31	2026	Residential	
The Ensemble 2	100 (328)	30	2026	Residential	
Scarlet	97 (318)	27	2026	Residential	
Terra	95 (312)	29	2026	Residential	
BrinkToren	90 (295)	28	2026	Residential	
Datacenter Westpoort	85 (279)	12	2026	Data center	
&Amsterdam	80 (262)	23	2026	Residential	
Amstel Vista	80 (262)	23	2027	Residential	
Hessenbergweg 109-119	76 (249)	22	2026	Residential	

=== Proposed ===
The following table ranks approved and proposed buildings in Amsterdam that are expected to be at least 75 m (246 ft) tall as of 2026, based on standard height measurement. The “Year” column indicates the expected year of completion.

Building	Height m (ft)	Floors	Year	Purpose	Notes
Eleven Home	143 (469)	44	–	Residential	
Arenapoort 1	140 (459)	35	–	Residential	
ZuDo1	105 (344)	24	–	Office	
Amsteloever	100 (328)	30	–	Residential	
ZuDo2	90 (295)	24	–	Residential	
ZuDo3	90 (295)	24	–	Residential	
Well House	86 (282)	21	–	Office	
Cambridge Towers blok C	78 (256)	24	–	Residential	
De Vreugdehof	78 (256)	24	–	Residential	
Karspeldreef 15	76 (249)	22	–	Residential	
Arenapoort 2	75 (246)	22	–	Residential	

== Skylines ==
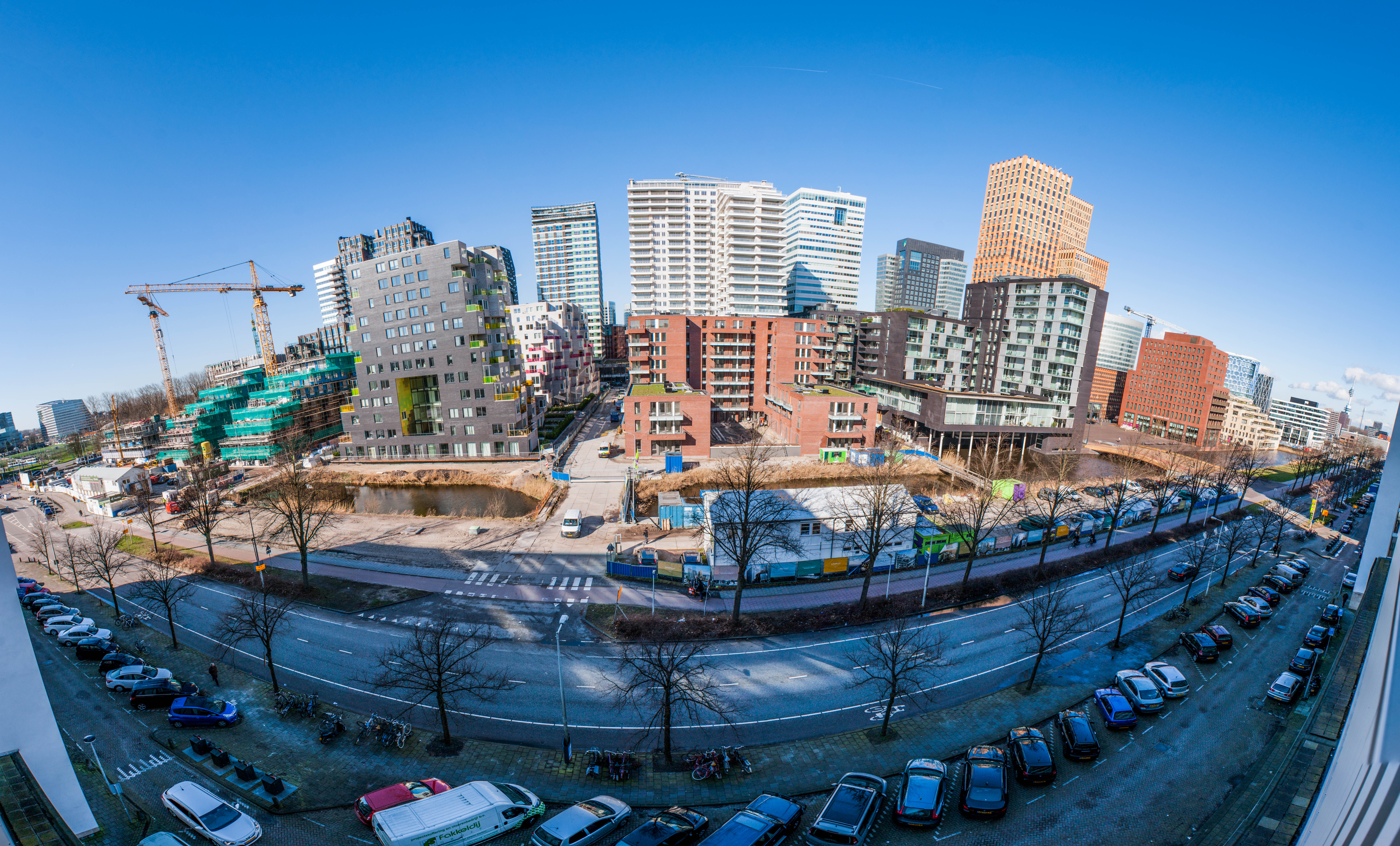
Zuidas

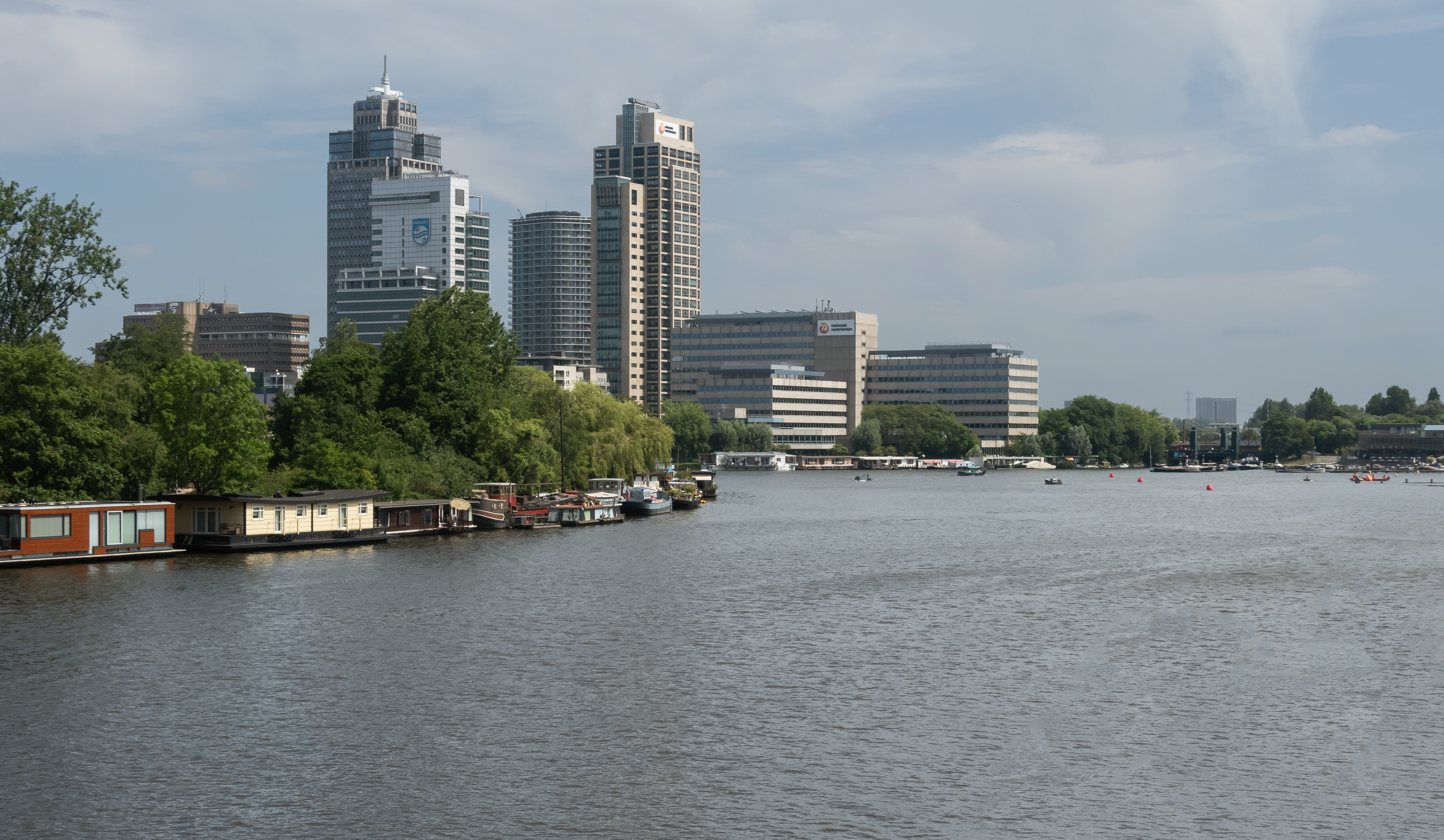
Omval

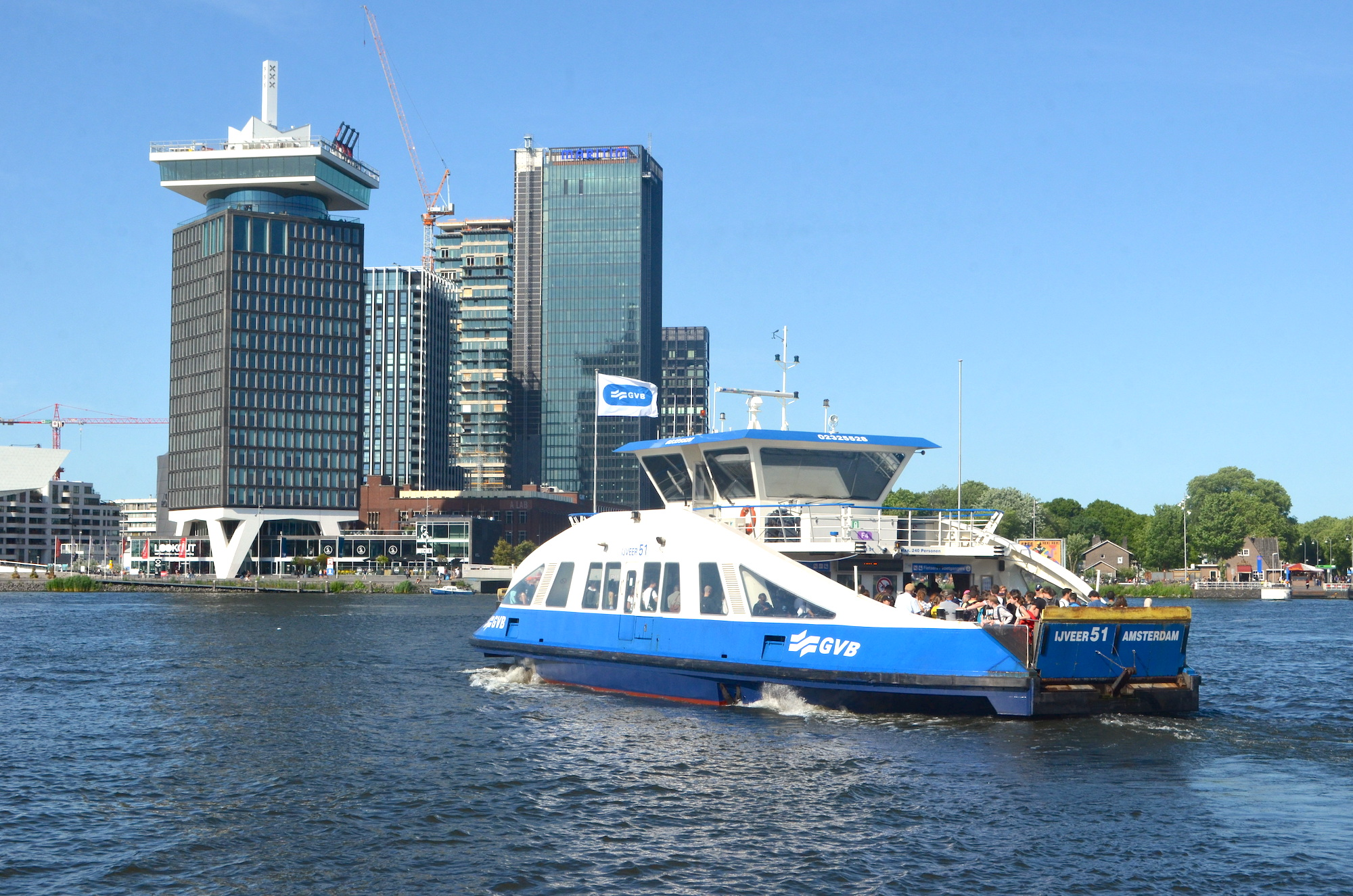
Overhoeks

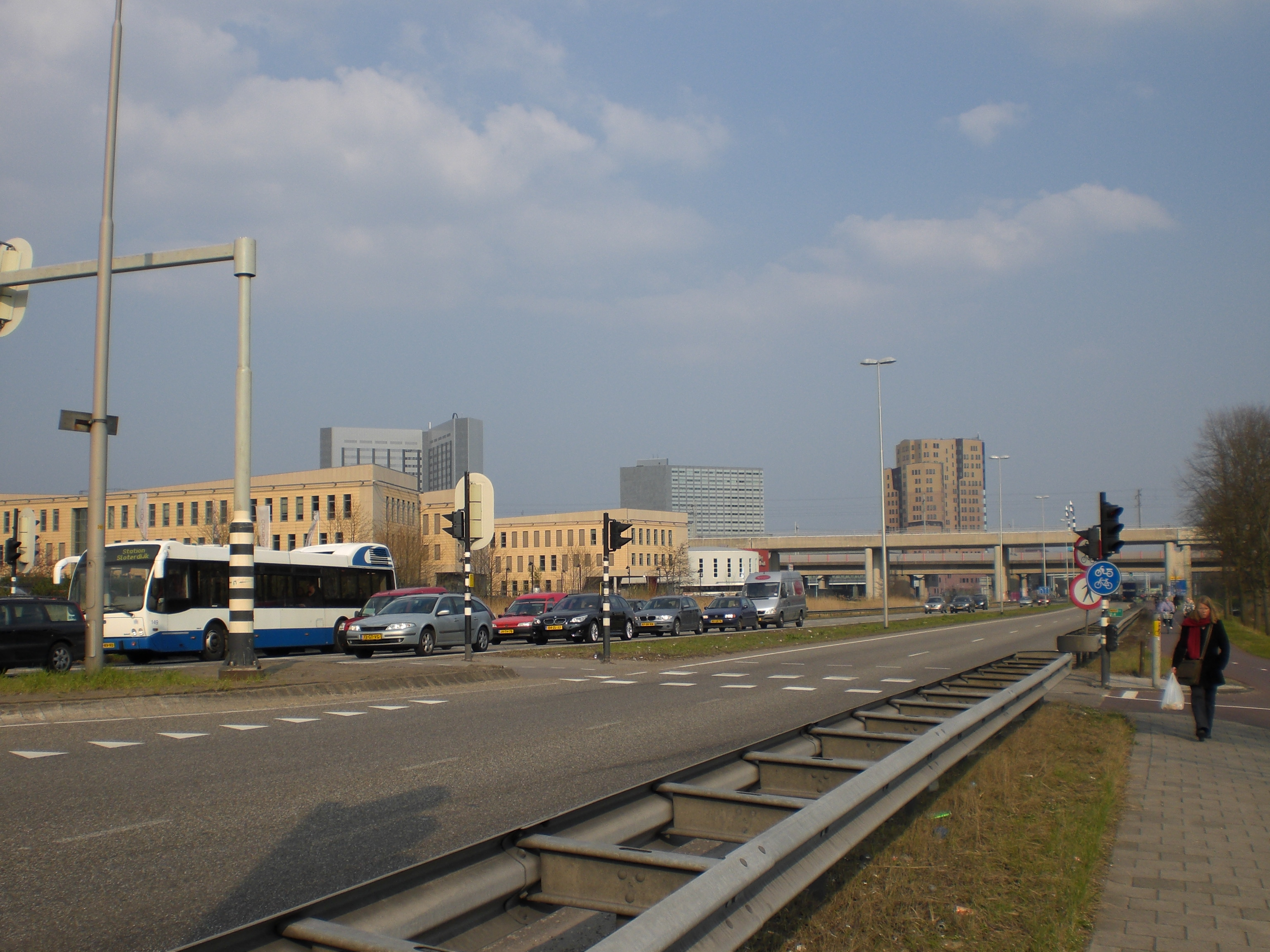
Teleport

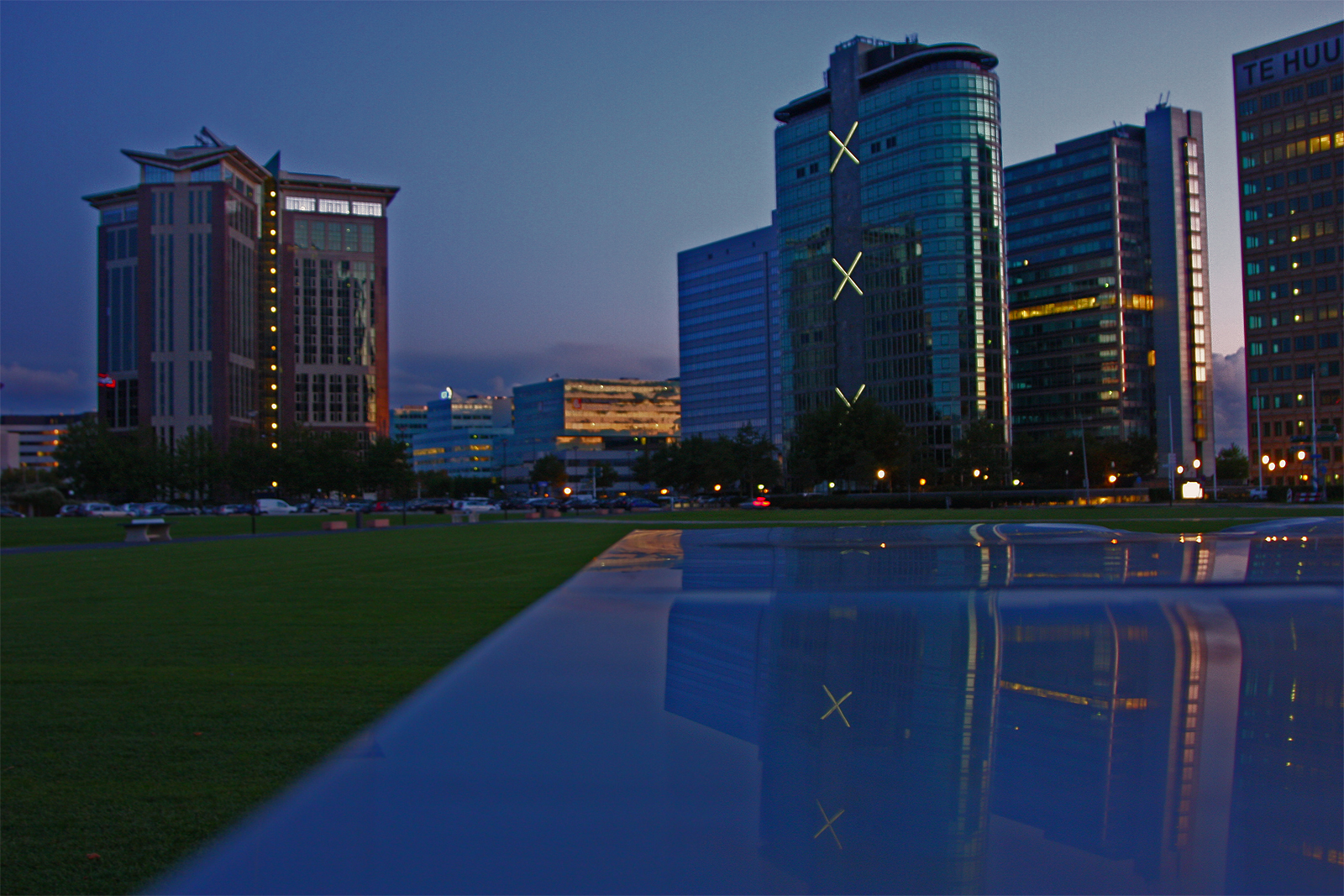
Bullewijk

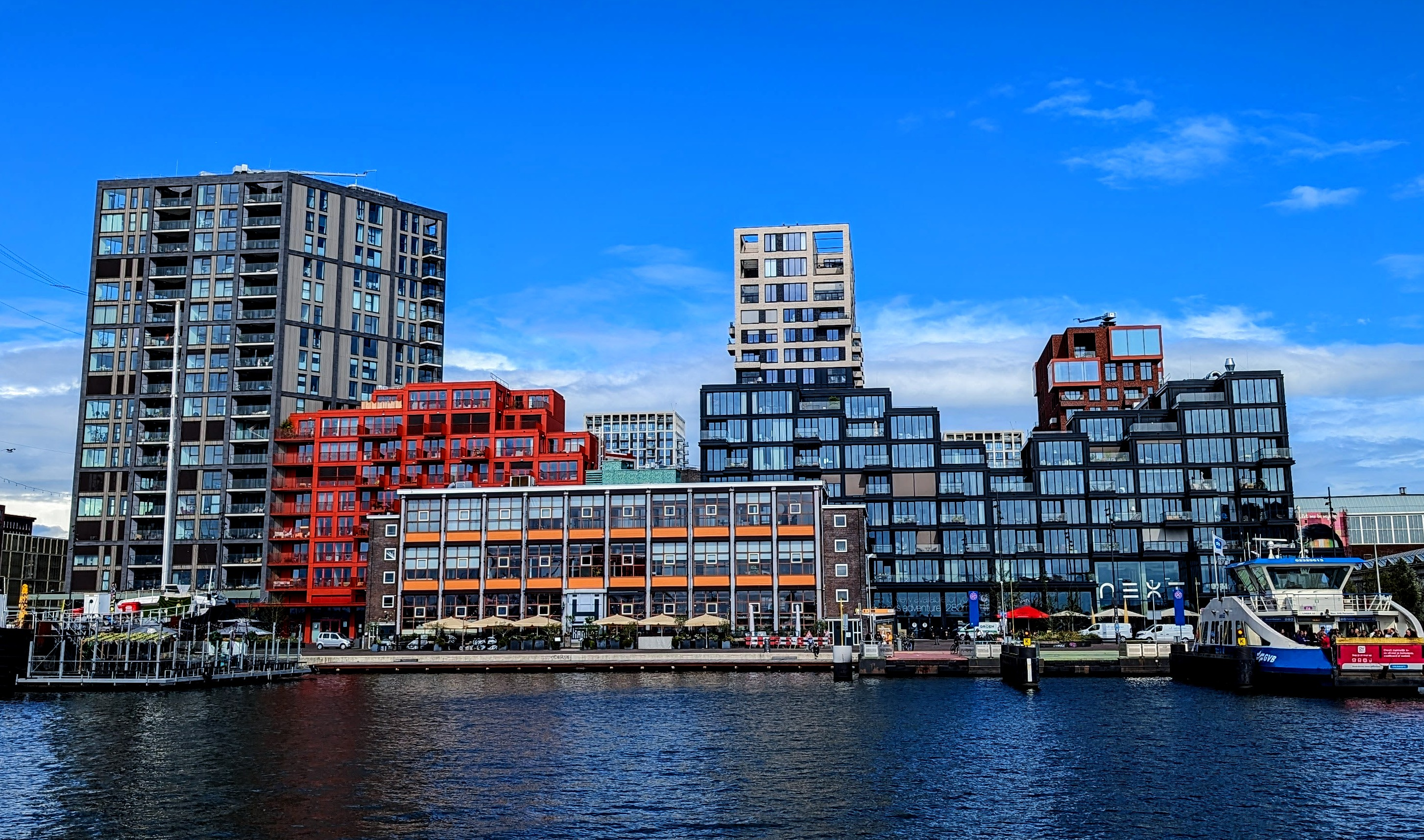
NDSM

== See also ==
- List of tallest buildings in the Netherlands
- List of tallest buildings in Eindhoven
- List of tallest buildings in Rotterdam
- List of tallest buildings in The Hague
- List of tallest buildings in Utrecht
