= Comparison of SSH servers =

An SSH server is a software program which uses the Secure Shell protocol to accept connections from remote computers. SFTP/SCP file transfers and remote terminal connections are popular use cases for an SSH server.

== General ==
| Name | Developer | Initial release | Platform | Latest release | | License |
| Name | Developer | Initial release | Platform | Version | Date | License |
|---|---|---|---|---|---|---|
| Apache MINA SSHD | Apache Software Foundation | 2009 | AIX | 2.16.0 | 23 August 2025 | Apache-2.0 |
| Apache MINA SSHD | Apache Software Foundation | 2009 | BSD | 2.16.0 | 23 August 2025 | Apache-2.0 |
| Apache MINA SSHD | Apache Software Foundation | 2009 | Linux | 2.16.0 | 23 August 2025 | Apache-2.0 |
| Apache MINA SSHD | Apache Software Foundation | 2009 | HP-UX | 2.16.0 | 23 August 2025 | Apache-2.0 |
| Apache MINA SSHD | Apache Software Foundation | 2009 | Java | 2.16.0 | 23 August 2025 | Apache-2.0 |
| Apache MINA SSHD | Apache Software Foundation | 2009 | macOS | 2.16.0 | 23 August 2025 | Apache-2.0 |
| Apache MINA SSHD | Apache Software Foundation | 2009 | Solaris | 2.16.0 | 23 August 2025 | Apache-2.0 |
| Apache MINA SSHD | Apache Software Foundation | 2009 | Windows | 2.16.0 | 23 August 2025 | Apache-2.0 |
| Bitvise SSH Server | Bitvise Limited | 2001 | Windows | 9.47 | 2025-09-02 | Proprietary (Note: No cost for non-commercial use.) |
| CopSSH | Itefix | 2003-08-12 | Cygwin | 7.21.1 | 2025-07-23 | Proprietary |
| CopSSH | Itefix | 2003-08-12 | Windows | 7.21.1 | 2025-07-23 | Proprietary |
| CrushFTP Server | CrushFTP, LLC | 2003-01-01 | AIX | 11.3.7 | 2025-10-01 | Proprietary (Note: Shareware.) |
| CrushFTP Server | CrushFTP, LLC | 2003-01-01 | BSD | 11.3.7 | 2025-10-01 | Proprietary |
| CrushFTP Server | CrushFTP, LLC | 2003-01-01 | Cygwin | 11.3.7 | 2025-10-01 | Proprietary |
| CrushFTP Server | CrushFTP, LLC | 2003-01-01 | Linux | 11.3.7 | 2025-10-01 | Proprietary |
| CrushFTP Server | CrushFTP, LLC | 2003-01-01 | HP-UX | 11.3.7 | 2025-10-01 | Proprietary |
| CrushFTP Server | CrushFTP, LLC | 2003-01-01 | Java | 11.3.7 | 2025-10-01 | Proprietary |
| CrushFTP Server | CrushFTP, LLC | 2003-01-01 | macOS | 11.3.7 | 2025-10-01 | Proprietary |
| CrushFTP Server | CrushFTP, LLC | 2003-01-01 | Solaris | 11.3.7 | 2025-10-01 | Proprietary |
| CrushFTP Server | CrushFTP, LLC | 2003-01-01 | Windows | 11.3.7 | 2025-10-01 | Proprietary |
| Dropbear | Matt Johnston | 2003-04-06 | AIX | 2026.90 | 2026-05-03 | MIT |
| Dropbear | Matt Johnston | 2003-04-06 | Android | 2026.90 | 2026-05-03 | MIT |
| Dropbear | Matt Johnston | 2003-04-06 | BSD | 2026.90 | 2026-05-03 | MIT |
| Dropbear | Matt Johnston | 2003-04-06 | Cygwin | 2026.90 | 2026-05-03 | MIT |
| Dropbear | Matt Johnston | 2003-04-06 | Linux | 2026.90 | 2026-05-03 | MIT |
| Dropbear | Matt Johnston | 2003-04-06 | HP-UX | 2026.90 | 2026-05-03 | MIT |
| Dropbear | Matt Johnston | 2003-04-06 | macOS | 2026.90 | 2026-05-03 | MIT |
| Dropbear | Matt Johnston | 2003-04-06 | Solaris | 2026.90 | 2026-05-03 | MIT |
| Dropbear | Matt Johnston | 2003-04-06 | webOS | 2026.90 | 2026-05-03 | MIT |
| lsh | Niels Möller | 1999-05-23 | BSD | 2.1 | 2013-06-26 | GPL-2.0-or-later |
| lsh | Niels Möller | 1999-05-23 | Linux | 2.1 | 2013-06-26 | GPL-2.0-or-later |
| lsh | Niels Möller | 1999-05-23 | Solaris | 2.1 | 2013-06-26 | GPL-2.0-or-later |
| lsh | Niels Möller | 1999-05-23 | macOS | 2.1 | 2013-06-26 | GPL-2.0-or-later |
| OpenSSH (Note: Also known as OpenBSD Secure Shell.) | The OpenBSD project | 1999-12-01 | AIX | 10.3 | 2026-04-02 | BSD |
| OpenSSH | The OpenBSD project | 1999-12-01 | AmigaOS | 10.3 | 2026-04-02 | BSD |
| OpenSSH | The OpenBSD project | 1999-12-01 | Android | 10.3 | 2026-04-02 | BSD |
| OpenSSH | The OpenBSD project | 1999-12-01 | BSD | 10.3 | 2026-04-02 | BSD |
| OpenSSH | The OpenBSD project | 1999-12-01 | Cygwin | 10.3 | 2026-04-02 | BSD |
| OpenSSH | The OpenBSD project | 1999-12-01 | Linux | 10.3 | 2026-04-02 | BSD |
| OpenSSH | The OpenBSD project | 1999-12-01 | HP-UX | 10.3 | 2026-04-02 | BSD |
| OpenSSH | The OpenBSD project | 1999-12-01 | iOS | 10.3 | 2026-04-02 | BSD |
| OpenSSH | The OpenBSD project | 1999-12-01 | macOS | 10.3 | 2026-04-02 | BSD |
| OpenSSH | The OpenBSD project | 1999-12-01 | OpenVMS | 10.3 | 2026-04-02 | BSD |
| OpenSSH | The OpenBSD project | 1999-12-01 | Solaris | 10.3 | 2026-04-02 | BSD |
| OpenSSH | The OpenBSD project | 1999-12-01 | webOS | 10.3 | 2026-04-02 | BSD |
| OpenSSH | The OpenBSD project | 1999-12-01 | Windows | 10.3 | 2026-04-02 | BSD |
| OpenSSH | The OpenBSD project | 1999-12-01 | z/OS | 10.3 | 2026-04-02 | BSD |
| Teleport | Gravitational | 2016-06-23 | | 18.2.1 | 2025-09-13 | Apache-2.0 |
| TinySSH | Jan Mojžíš | 2015-08-01 | BSD | 20250501 | 2025-05-01 | Public domain (Note: Also available as MIT or 0BSD) |
| TinySSH | Jan Mojžíš | 2015-08-01 | Linux | 20250501 | 2025-05-01 | Public domain |
| TinySSH | Jan Mojžíš | 2015-08-01 | macOS | 20250501 | 2025-05-01 | Public domain |
| wolfSSH | wolfSSL | 2016-07-20 | BSD | 1.5.0 | 2026-04-20 | GPL-3.0-or-later (Note: Also available under a proprietary license.) |
| wolfSSH | wolfSSL | 2016-07-20 | Cygwin | 1.5.0 | 2026-04-20 | GPL-3.0-or-later |
| wolfSSH | wolfSSL | 2016-07-20 | Linux | 1.5.0 | 2026-04-20 | GPL-3.0-or-later |
| wolfSSH | wolfSSL | 2016-07-20 | macOS | 1.5.0 | 2026-04-20 | GPL-3.0-or-later |
| wolfSSH | wolfSSL | 2016-07-20 | Solaris | 1.5.0 | 2026-04-20 | GPL-3.0-or-later |
| wolfSSH | wolfSSL | 2016-07-20 | Windows | 1.5.0 | 2026-04-20 | GPL-3.0-or-later |

== Platform ==
The operating systems or virtual machines the SSH servers are designed to run on without emulation; there are several possibilities:

- No indicates that it does not exist or was never released.
- Partial indicates that while it works, the server lacks important functionality compared to versions for other OSs but may still be under development.
- Beta indicates that while a version is fully functional and has been released, it is still in development (e.g. for stability).
- Yes indicates that it has been officially released in a fully functional, stable version.
- Dropped indicates that while the server works, new versions are no longer being released for the indicated OS; the number in parentheses is the last known stable version which was officially released for that OS.
- Included indicates that the server comes pre-packaged with or has been integrated into the operating system.

The list is not exhaustive, but rather reflects the most common platforms today.

| Name | macOS | Windows | Cygwin | BSD | Linux | Solaris | Java | OpenVMS | z/OS | AmigaOS | AIX | HP-UX | iOS (Note: iPhone, iPod Touch. Unless otherwise noted, iPhone refers to non-jailbroken devices.) | webOS | Android |
|---|---|---|---|---|---|---|---|---|---|---|---|---|---|---|---|
| Apache MINA SSHD | Yes | Yes | No | Yes | Yes | Yes | Yes | No | No | No | Yes | Yes | No | No | No |
| Bitvise SSH Server | No | Yes | No | No | No | No | No | No | No | No | No | No | No | No | No |
| CopSSH | No | Yes | Yes | No | No | No | No | No | No | No | No | No | No | No | No |
| CrushFTP Server | Yes | Yes | Yes | Yes | Yes | Yes | Yes | No | No | No | Yes | Yes | No | No | No |
| Dropbear | Yes | No | Yes | Yes | Yes | Yes | No | No | No | No | Yes | Yes | No | Yes (Note: OpenSSH and Dropbear are available as optware packages installed by PreWare (maintained by WebOS Internals).) | Yes |
| lsh | Yes | No | No | Partial (Note: Lsh supports only one BSD platform officially, FreeBSD.) | Yes | Yes | No | No | No | No | No | No | No | No | Unknown |
| OpenSSH (Note: Also known as OpenBSD Secure Shell.) | Included | Optional (Note: Native OpenSSH for Windows 10 is an optional feature that can be installed. OpenSSH can be installed in windows from windows 10 version 1709 and up. The project is called Win32-OpenSSH (contains 64bit as well), hosted on GitHub.) | Included | Included | Included (Note: Most Linux distributions have OpenSSH as an official package, but a few do not.) | Yes | No | Yes | Yes | Yes | Yes (Note: OpenSSH 3.4 was the first release included since AIX.) | Included | Yes (Note: Only for jailbroken devices.) | Yes | Partial |
| TinySSH | Yes | Unknown | Unknown | Yes | Yes | Unknown | Unknown | Unknown | Unknown | Unknown | Unknown | Unknown | Unknown | Unknown | Unknown |
| wolfSSH | Yes | Yes | Yes | Yes | Yes | Yes | No | No | No | No | No | No | No | No | No |

== Features ==
| Name | SSH1 | SSH2 | Port forwarding | SFTP | SCP | IPv6 | OpenSSH authorized keys | Privilege separation | FIPS 140-2 |
|---|---|---|---|---|---|---|---|---|---|
| Apache MINA SSHD | No | Yes | Yes | Yes | Yes | Yes | Yes | No | Unknown |
| Bitvise SSH Server | No | Yes | Yes | Yes | Yes | Yes | Yes | Yes | Yes |
| CopSSH | No | Yes | Yes | Yes | Yes | Yes | Yes | Yes | Unknown |
| CrushFTP Server | No | Yes | Yes | Yes | Yes | Yes | Yes | Yes | Unknown |
| Dropbear | No | Yes | Yes | Partial | Yes | Yes | Yes | No | Unknown |
| Lsh | No | Yes | Yes | Yes | Yes | Unknown | Unknown | Unknown | Unknown |
| OpenSSH (Note: Also known as OpenBSD Secure Shell.) | No | Yes | Yes | Yes | Yes | Yes | Yes | Yes | Yes (Note: OpenSSH server can be built with FIPS 140-2.) |
| TinySSH | No | Yes | No | No | No | Yes | Yes | Unknown | No |
| wolfSSH | No | Yes | Yes | Yes | Yes | Yes | Yes | No | Yes |

== See also ==
- Comparison of SSH clients
