= Teleport =

Teleport may refer to:

- To teleport is to engage in the act of teleportation:
  - Teleportation
  - Quantum teleportation
  - Warping, the act of interlevel teleporting in video games
- Teleport (Amsterdam), a neighborhood of Amsterdam, Netherlands
- Teleport (software), an Al Infrastructure Identity company
- Teleport Communications Group, a subsidiary of AT&T
- Teleport (Staten Island), a business park on Staten Island, New York
- A telecommunications port, commonly shortened to "teleport", a type of satellite ground station
- Telescopic handler, called "Teleport" in the UK and Ireland
- Tokyo Teleport Station
- Teleport, the air cargo business of AirAsia

== See also ==
- Teleportation (disambiguation)
- Teleporter (disambiguation)
