= A'dam =

A'dam may refer to:

- Amsterdam, the capital of the Netherlands
- A'DAM, the former Shell-Toren or Toren Overhoeks in Amsterdam
- A'dam (The Wheel of Time), a magical item in the fictional world of Robert Jordan's The Wheel of Time series
