= A Dark Traveling =

1987 novel by Roger Zelazny

- Cover of first edition (hardcover)
- Author: Roger Zelazny
- Illustrator: Lebbus Woods
- Cover artist: Lebbus Woods
- Language: English
- Series: Millennium
- Genre: Science fantasy
- Publisher: Walker and Company
- Publication date: 1987
- Publication place: United States
- Media type: Print
- Pages: 143
- ISBN: 0-8027-6686-2
- OCLC: 248644304
- Dewey Decimal: FIC
- LC Class: PZ7.Z3963 Dar 1987

A Dark Traveling is a science fantasy novel by American writer Roger Zelazny. The story uses teleportation as both fantasy and science fiction elements. It is the only novel that he wrote for young adults and one of only three books without a heroic protagonist.

== Plot introduction ==
When an injured scientist disappears into a parallel world that is the battlefield between the forces of light and dark, his children set out to find him.

== Setting ==
Our Earth is only one of many parallel Earths split off from each other by world-changing historical events. Over many generations, the Wiley family guards and develops our Earth's transcomp, a portal to the other worlds. Parallel Earths are called bands, a term taken from the bandwidth or frequency that a transcomp tunes to in order to open a portal to each world. There are four categories of bands:

- Lightbands are friendly worlds that exchange information, students, and observers.
- Graybands are worlds without transcomps and delicate historical conditions.
- Deadbands have no people, but they have artifacts of past ruined civilizations.
- Darkbands exploit other bands with lower levels of technology.

Lightbands and darkbands prosecute wars against each other on some bands.

== Characters ==
- James Wiley – A 15-year-old boy, an incipient werewolf, joins with his sister Becky and exchange-student Barry; their goal is to find and rescue his father and mother, who are missing among the bands.
- Becky Wiley – A tough 14-year-old sorceress and James' adopted sister; she transports James, Barry, and herself to other bands without using a transcomp.
- Barry – A 15-year-old exchange student is a trained assassin and devotee of the martial arts.
- George – James' uncle, a werewolf and shapeshifter, saves James, Becky, and Barry from certain death.
- Tom Wiley – James and Becky's father runs a transcomp and a science think tank in the American Southwest.
- Agatha Wiley – James' mother, a sorceress, psychically fights Crow, a darkband sorcerer. James is led to believe that she is dead.
- The Golem (Golly) – An android is activated by James to protect the Wiley family's transcomp.
- Crow – A darkband sorcerer attempts to stop the children from destroying a transmitter that disables the lightband's transcomps.
- Transcomps – Transporters connected to computers open portals to other bands.

== Plot summary ==
Becky Wiley has a vision of someone threatening her father, Tom Wiley, in their transcomp room. She runs to the control room and finds blood on the floor. The transmission part of the transcomp is destroyed, but the receiving mechanism still works.

She waits for her brother, James, and their exchange-student Barry to return home. They theorize that Tom is attacked by an intruder. After a brief fight in which one of them is wounded, Tom escapes through the transcomp. The intruder damages the sending capability of the transcomp and leaves. The children think Tom is probably wounded, so they decide to find and help him. The controls on the transcomp suggest two possible bands for Tom's escape.

As a sorceress Becky has the ability to transport the boys to the bands in question without a transcomp. She sends them to the wrong worlds, however. Barry is sent to a deadband where he verifies that Tom is not there.

James arrives at night in a world with a full moon. He has his first transformation into a werewolf. His uncle George, a werewolf and shapeshifter, is the resident transcomp operator. He finds and cares for James. He expects James because Barry arrives earlier from the deadband.

Tom escapes to a darkband, a former lightband which is only partly controlled by the darkbanders. Forces from the lightbands including Tom and Agatha, James' mother, are assisting a rebellion against the darkbanders. It is closely fought so darkbanders are attacking lightbander transcomps to stop armed lightbanders from entering the war.

Becky arrives later through her own magical means of travel to bands. Through sorceress to sorceress communication with Agatha, Becky discovers that the darkbanders are jamming the lightbanders' transcomp on the battlefield with a special transmitter so that lightbander reinforcements can not pour in from their transcomps. Agatha is involved in a psychic battle with a darkbander sorcerer named Crow.

The children decide to go with Becky to the darkbander's camp and destroy the transmitter. They arrive in a wood at the edge of the camp. They identify a tent that they think houses the jamming transmitter. Through a spell Becky is able to make them invisible so that the darklanders in the camp can not see them. They reach the tent and although Becky senses danger, they enter. Crow, the blackbander sorcerer, confronts them in the tent. He disables Barry and focuses his attention on Becky, who engages him in psychic combat. Although the sorcerer is able to slow him down, James manages to push the transmitter off its table and break it. Uncle George follows the children and, in werewolf form, bounds into the tent and kills the sorcerer.

Without the jamming of their transcomp, the lightbanders bring in their reinforcements and eke out a victory. However, the margin of victory to so minute and of such world-changing significance that a new darkbander world is created in which the darkbanders prevail. The children find Tom and Agatha. Tom is wounded superficially. They return to their Earth realizing that the darkbanders will have to be fought again and again.

== Literary discussion ==
=== Prose poetry ===
Zelazny has been praised as a prose poet – a writer who uses poetic elements such as form, image, structure, alliteration, internal rhyme and metaphor. James' transformation into a werewolf for the first time is an example of this style:

Dreaming.
Running at a steady lope, the night alive with sounds and scents. Down hillside, along stream's dark bank. Pausing to drink the cold black water. All shapes are gray. The earth is signed with the smell of smaller game. I take a trail, follow for a time, lose it, try another. Moving quickly now, shadow amid shadows. Slipping ghostlike through brush and bramble. My senses extend me beyond my skull. I am become a piece of the night.
It is hunger, the rush of events, the heat of the hunt. Ahead, I hear movements. It knows I am coming. It flees. I taste the darkness, I hear the song the moon sings. . . .
There is no time, and as for space, it seems I move with such ease that the world rushes to meet me. I am suspended in the dark dream of the hunt, where reason sleeps as the scroll of sensation unwinds. I am dog-shaped death within the wood of the world, thing of fang and hunger. Beneath sky's eyes beast to feast blooding moon-turned hours . . .
I was lost within the bitter dream of predator and prey, time without time, as night washed me and carried me far away.

=== Protagonists ===
Theodore Krulik, one of Zelazny's literary biographers, has indicated that Zelazny's protagonists are all cast from a certain mold:

More than most writers, Zelazny persists in reworking a persona composed of a single literary vision. This vision is the unraveling of a complex personality with special abilities, intelligent, cultured, experienced in many areas, but who is fallible, needing emotional maturity, and who candidly reflects upon the losses in his life. This complex persona cuts across all of Zelazny’s writings. . . .

Jane Lindskold takes a different view: James Wiley is an example of an ordinary person "who is forced into action by extraordinary circumstances". It is difficult to call a werewolf ordinary, but he does not fit the heroic protagonist, and his boyish nature is emphasized throughout the story. Like any boy with siblings, James struggles with the idea that his younger sister and Barry share secrets with adults, considering him too immature to share these secrets. A hero would not have such limitations, as James does: "It seems that I am destined always to be surrounded by secrets—and not to be in on most of them". He later complains indignantly to Becky:

”Everybody knows stuff I don’t!”. . .”Even you! And you’re a lot younger! How come Dad told you all this stuff when he didn’t tell me?”

Despite being a werewolf, James is in other respects a 14-year-old boy.

== Publication history ==
- Zelazny, Roger (1987). A Dark Traveling. Walker and Co. p. 143. ISBN 0-8027-6686-2.
- Zelazny, Roger (1989). A Dark Travelling. Hutchinson. pp. 109. Hardcover. ISBN 0-09-173756-7.
- Zelazny, Roger (1989). A Dark Traveling. Avon. pp. 151. Paperback. ISBN 0-380-70567-2.
- Zalazny, Roger (1990). A Dark Travelling. Beaver. pp. 109. Paperback. ISBN 0-09-960970-3.
- Zalazny, Roger (2003). To Die in Italbar/A Dark Travelling. ibooks. pp. 310. Hardcover. ISBN 0-7434-4536-8.
- Zalazny, Roger (2004). To Die in Italbar/A Dark Travelling. ibooks. pp. 310. Paperback. ISBN 0-7434-7914-9.
