= Mushroom (disambiguation) =

A mushroom is the fruiting body of a fungus.

Mushroom(s) or The Mushroom may also refer to:

== Companies ==
- Mushroom Group, an Australian music and entertainment company
  - Mushroom Pictures, a film production and distribution subsidiary
  - Mushroom Records, a record label subsidiary
- Mushroom Networks, an American telecommunications networking company
- Mushroom Records (Canada), a record label
- Mushroom Studios, a music studio in Vancouver, British Columbia, Canada
- Mushroom TV, a defunct British television company

== Film and television ==
- The Mushroom (1970 film), French film
- Mushrooms (1995 film), Australian film
- The Mushroom (1997 film), Egyptian film
- Mushrooms (film) or Chatrak, 2011 Indian Bengali film
- "Mushrooms" (Law & Order), television episode

== Music ==
- Mushroom (band), an American musicians' collective in the San Francisco Bay area
- Andrew Vowles, or Mushroom, British musician, founding member of Massive Attack
- Mushroom (album) or the title song, by Eatmewhileimhot, 2012
- "Mushroom" (song), by Can, 1971

== Places ==
- Mushroom (lava flow), a lava flow in Yukon, Canada
- Mushroom Island, Antarctica
- Mushroom Lake, an alpine lake in Custer County, Idaho, US
- Mushroom Peak, a mountain in Alberta, Canada
- The Mushroom, a rock formation in Timna Valley, Israel

== Other uses ==
- Mushroom (Mario), a type of power-up in Super Mario video games
- Mushroom bodies, neural structure pair in arthropods involved in learning and memory
- Mushroom gene, a gene that affects pigment in horses
- The deformation of various expanding bullets
- Mushroom cloud
