= Teleporter (disambiguation) =

Teleporter may refer to:

- A device that enables teleportation
- A person that travels via teleportation
- A telescopic handler, a cherry-picker, a truck with a telescoping boom arm and crewed bucket
- Mushroom Networks Teleporter, a streaming broadcast system
- Teleporter (album), a 2000 compilation album by Pseudo Echo
- The Teleporter (film), a 2010 short film from "Chad, Matt & Rob"
- Der Teleporter (story; German: The Teleporter), a short story in the Perry Rhodan literary universe

== See also ==
- Teleportation (disambiguation)
- Teleport (disambiguation)
