= Omval =

- Neighbourhood of Amsterdam
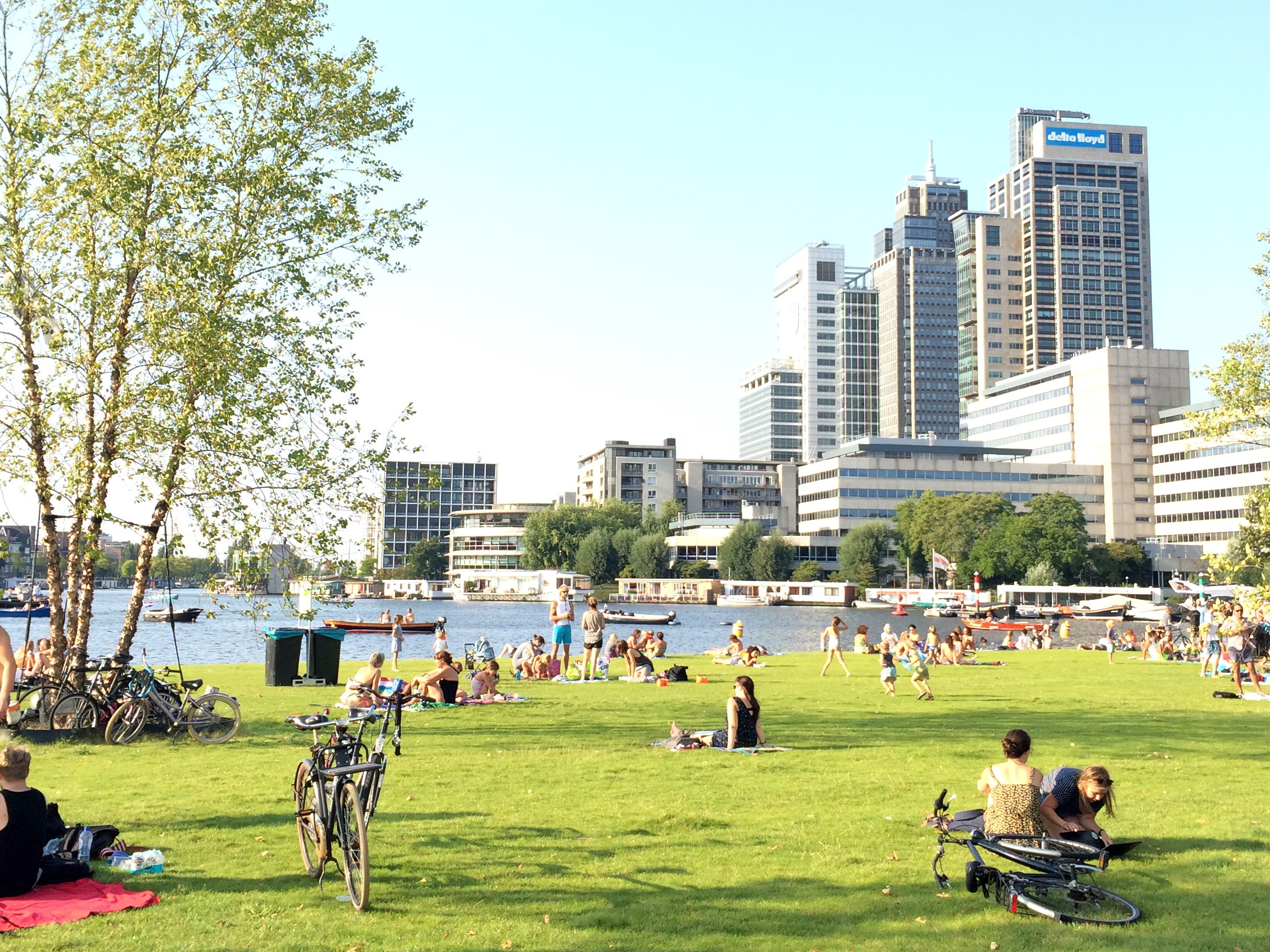
- Omval seen from the Korte Ouderkerkerdijk on the other side of the Amstel

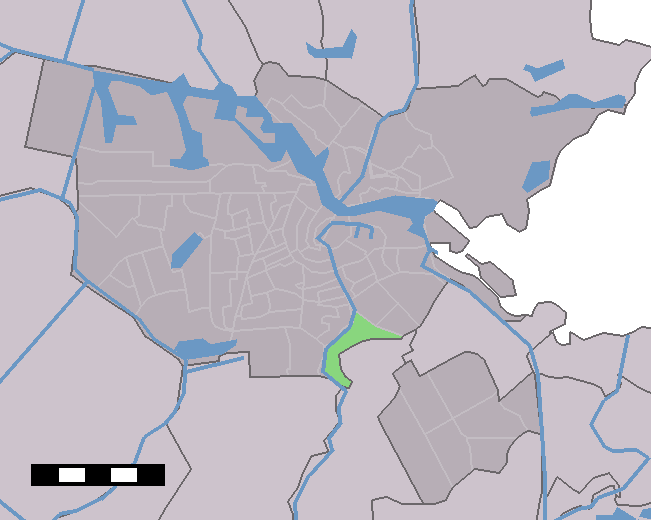
- Location of Omval (green) in Amsterdam
- Coordinates: 52°20′02″N 4°54′44″E
- Country: Netherlands
- Province: North Holland
- Municipality: Amsterdam
- Borough: Oost
- Time zone: UTC+1 (CET)
- Postal code: 1096

Omval is a neighbourhood situated on a peninsula on the eastern shore of the Amstel river in Amsterdam, Netherlands. It is situated south of the Weesperzijde neighbourhood and next to the Amsterdam Amstel railway station in the borough of Amsterdam-Oost. In the 1990s, it became the site of a major business district featuring the Rembrandt Tower, the tallest skyscraper in Amsterdam.

== History ==
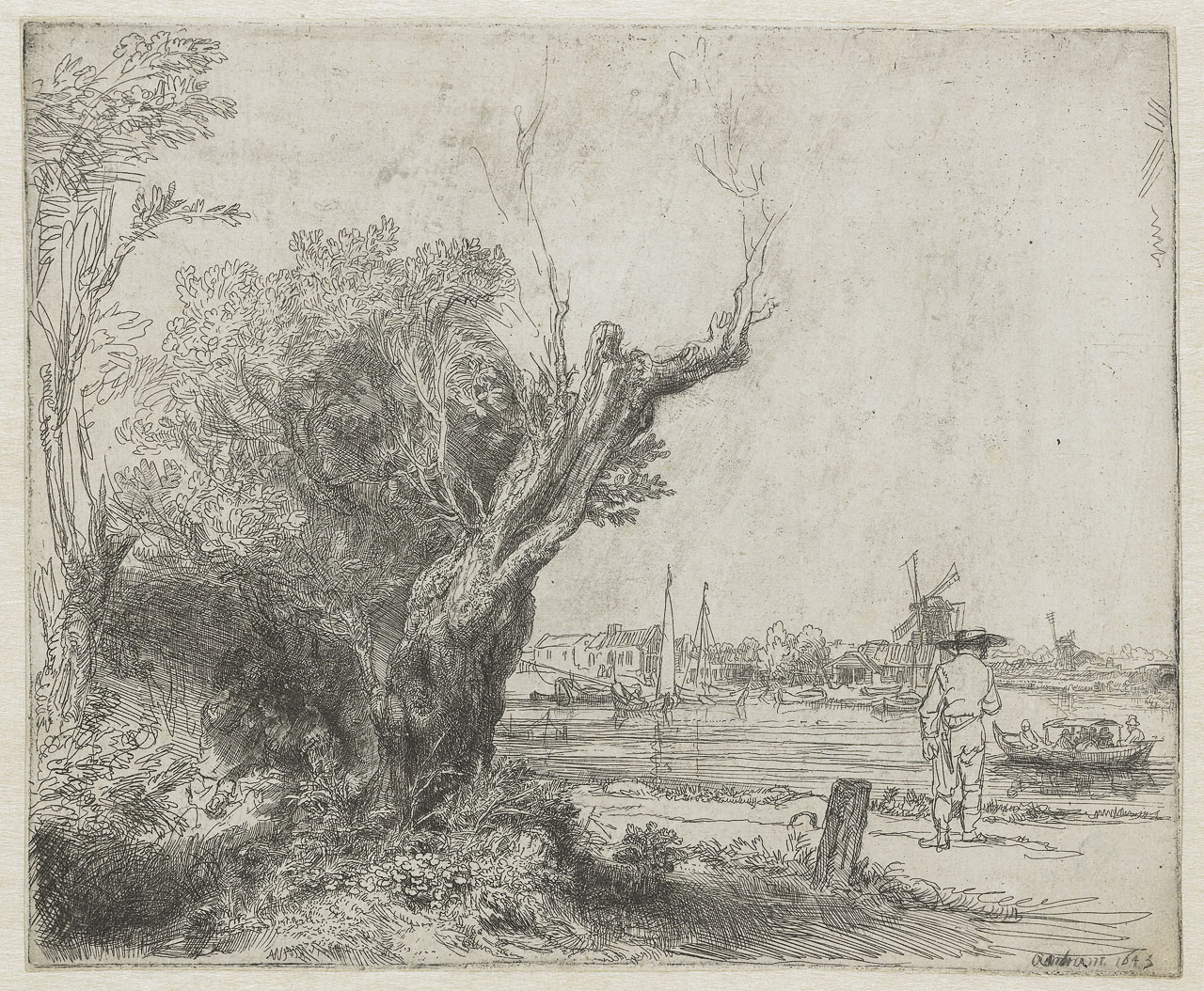
De Omval aan de Amstel (1645) by Rembrandt.

The Omval area became a peninsula in a meander of the Amstel river when the Watergraafsmeer, a polder in the east of the city, was drained and reclaimed in 1629. Originally, the Omval was part of the Ouder-Amstel municipality, but in 1921 the peninsula was added to the city of Amsterdam. The name Omval refers to the sharp turn in the river Amstel. In order to safely pass this turn, sailboats transporting goods on the river in the 17th century had to tack their sails (overstag gaan or omvallen in Dutch) to change direction.

An etching by Rembrandt, who was known to be working in the area, depicts the Omval area in the mid-1600s. The print shows a man standing on the Amstel embankment and two lovers sitting underneath an old willow tree, as well as a windmill used to pump water from the polder. In Rembrandt's time, the Omval was a popular countryside recreation area.

In the 20th century, the Omval became a mixed commercial and light industry area which was then on the edge of the city. In the 1990s, this area was redeveloped into a major business district, which was now firmly within the metropolitan area due to the city's expansion in southeastern direction and well-connected via train and metro because of the nearby Amsterdam Amstel railway station. Along the river bank, a number of luxury apartment buildings were constructed.

== Notable buildings ==
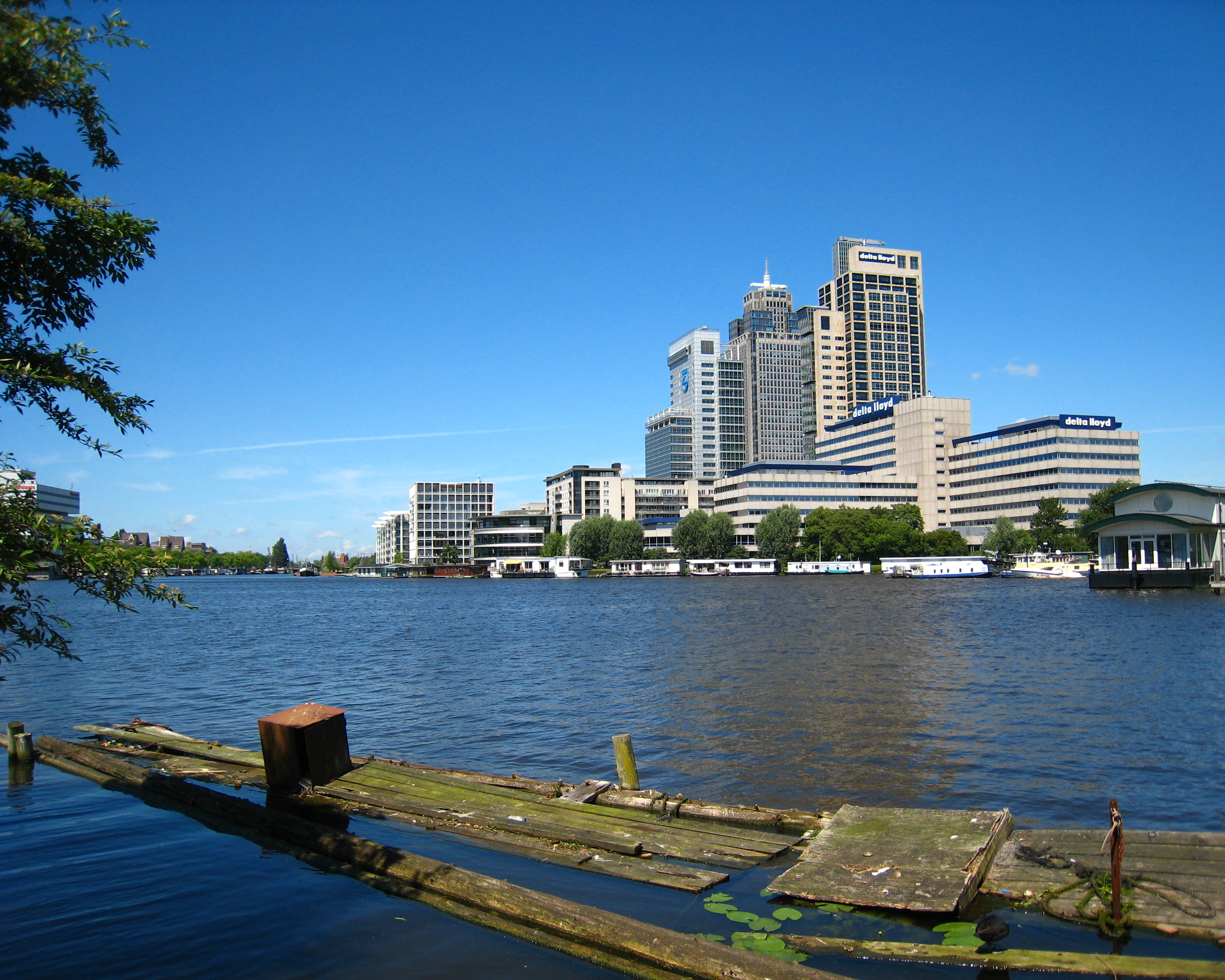
The Omval business district as seen from the south.

Until 1964, the Omval was home to the former Blooker factory, well known in the Netherlands for producing cocoa powder. The factory's guardhouse (1886) was reconstructed in 2003 and currently houses a bar and restaurant. Other former businesses at the Omval include the Puralimento fruit preserves factory, Efa Produka vacuum cleaners, Erdal shoes polishes, the Netherlands Ministry of Defence, a postal and telecommunications school, Bertels oil refinery and Maschmeijer Aromatics.

In 1987, the Amsterdam municipal council approved plans to build three skyscrapers in the Omval district, to be named after Dutch painters. The first building to be completed was the Rembrandt Tower (1995), modelled after the Empire State Building in New York City, which became the tallest building in the city. With its 135 meters, it has become a notable landmark in the city's skyline. In 2001, the Mondriaan Tower and Breitner Tower were completed. The Breitner Tower became the headquarters of Philips Electronics and is therefore also known as the Philips Tower. The Mondriaan currently houses the headquarters of Delta Lloyd Insurance Group and Rabobank Amsterdam.

Next to the Rembrandt Tower, on the site of the headquarters of the former Postbank, is the Leeuwenburg building of the Hogeschool van Amsterdam (HvA), the city's university of applied sciences. Covering a total of 65,000 square meters, Leeuwenburg is one of the largest campuses of HvA.
