= CopSSH =

Implementation of OpenSSH for Windows

- Developer(s): Itefix
- Initial release: August 12, 2003; 22 years ago
- Stable release: 7.21.1 / July 23, 2025; 35 days ago
- Written in: C
- Operating system: Windows
- Type: Remote Access
- License: Commercial, Cygwin, OpenSSH and OpenSSL are free software, CopSSH server is proprietary, client is free.
- Website: https://www.itefix.net/copssh

CopSSH is an implementation of OpenSSH for Windows. CopSSH offers both SSH client and server functionality and can be used for remote administration of Windows systems. CopSSH contains DLLs from the Cygwin Linux environment and a version of OpenSSH compiled from Cygwin. An administration GUI is also provided as of version 4.0.0.

== History ==
The first version of CopSSH was developed in mid-2003 and was published as a free package on the Security Focus Secure Shell mailing list. CopSSH has since then become very well known and has been given various updates with newer versions of its underlying solutions.

== Features ==
The CopSSH client can be used to initiate SSH/SFTP/SCP connections, while the CopSSH server is used as the SSH or SFTP server.

CopSSH administration GUI has the following features:

- Service, connection, and event status
- User Access Control with activation wizard
- Public Key Administration with PKA wizard
- SSH Server Configuration
- SFTP Server Configuration

== See also ==
- OpenSSH
- OpenSSL
- Secure File Transfer Protocol
- Cygwin
