= Teleportation (disambiguation) =

Teleportation is the fictional or imagined process by which matter is instantaneously transferred from one place to another.

Teleportation may also refer to:

- Quantum teleportation, a method of transmitting quantum data
- Teleportation (virtualization), a method of moving a running virtual machine between two physical computers

== See also ==
- Teleport (disambiguation)
- Teleporter (disambiguation)
