= Sluisbuurt =

- Interactive map of Sluisbuurt
- Municipality: Amsterdam
- Borough: Amsterdam-Oost

Area
  - Total: 32 ha (79 acres)
- Postal code: 1095

Sluisbuurt is a neighbourhood, currently partially under construction, located on Zeeburgereiland in the borough of Amsterdam-Oost in Amsterdam, Netherlands. The district lies near the Oranjesluizen (Orange Locks), from which it takes its name, and the Binnen-IJ. It is situated between the Zuiderzeeweg, the Schellingwouderbrug, and the IJburglaan towards the Piet Heintunnel.

== History ==
In November 2018, the municipality of Amsterdam decided to proceed with the construction of the Sluisbuurt. The plan envisions around 5,500 residential units, in an urban design that is atypical for Amsterdam, featuring a mix of residential blocks interspersed with high-rise towers. The site was designated as an "acceleration location" to quickly address the housing shortage that emerged after the financial crisis.

According to the development plan, there will be 32 residential towers, including 7 lower towers (22.5–30 meters), 14 mid-rise towers (30–60 meters), and 10 high-rise towers (over 70 meters), with an average building height of approximately 60 meters and a maximum height of 125 meters. A main thoroughfare will connect the Zuiderzeeweg tram stop (part of the IJtram line) to a central water basin and the Oranjesluizen at the northern end of Zeeburgereiland. The basin is intended for water recreation and connects a canal system that manages the neighbourhood's water levels to the adjacent Amsterdam–Rhine Canal. A university of applied sciences (hogeschool) will also be located near the basin.

A bicycle bridge is proposed to connect the water basin to the Eastern Docklands. In the interim, a ferry service was launched on 9 January 2023, operating between Sluisbuurt and Tegelbergplein on the tip of Sporenburg.

The plan's large-scale high-rise development marked a departure from Amsterdam's traditional urban fabric, generating controversy. Critics expressed concerns about the visual impact on the UNESCO-protected canal belt and the rural northern areas, as well as potential financial risks and socio-demographic consequences of tower living. Concerns were also raised about the erosion of the traditional Amsterdam street character. However, on 6 November 2019, the Council of State dismissed all objections against the zoning plan.

Some historic buildings along the Zuider IJdijk and part of the lock complex remain within the development area.

In September 2021, a landmark artwork, Het Palenhuis by Piet van Wijk, was installed in the neighbourhood.

== List of Buildings ==
Building	Height	Start Construction	Completion	Function	Architect	Owner/Developer
Justus	100m	2021	2024	Residential	De Architekten Cie.	Syntrus Achmea
Hogeschool Inholland		2021	2023	Education	Cepezed	Hogeschool Inholland
DUWO Student Housing	70m	2021	2023	Residential	Mei Architects	DUWO
De Alliantie Residential Tower	70m	2025	2027	Residential		De Alliantie
Nachteiland	70m	2025	2027	Residential		
Patchwork	50m	2025	2027	Residential		
Montessori Lyceum Sluisbuurt				Education	De Architekten Cie.	Montessori Lyceum Amsterdam

== Street Names ==
In April 2022, the municipality decided on a naming theme for the streets in Sluisbuurt, opting to commemorate the "history of dance and modern ballet." The main street was named after Rudi van Dantzig. Other streets were named after Rudolf Nureyev, Sonia Gaskell, Isadora Duncan, August Bournonville, George Balanchine, Florrie Rodrigo, Marius Petipa, Pina Bausch, Anna Pavlova, Hans Snoek, Margot Fonteyn, and Serge Lifar. An unusual addition was the naming of a bridge after Sergei Diaghilev.

== Images ==
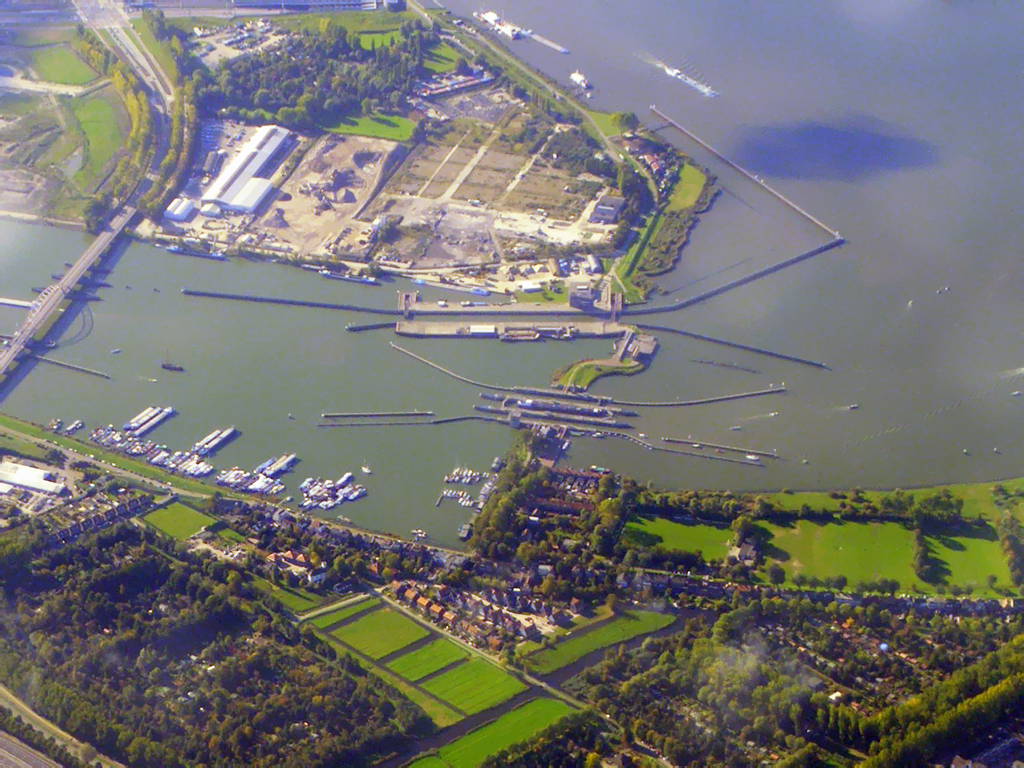
The area in 2007, viewed from the north. Sluisbuurt is located just above the locks.

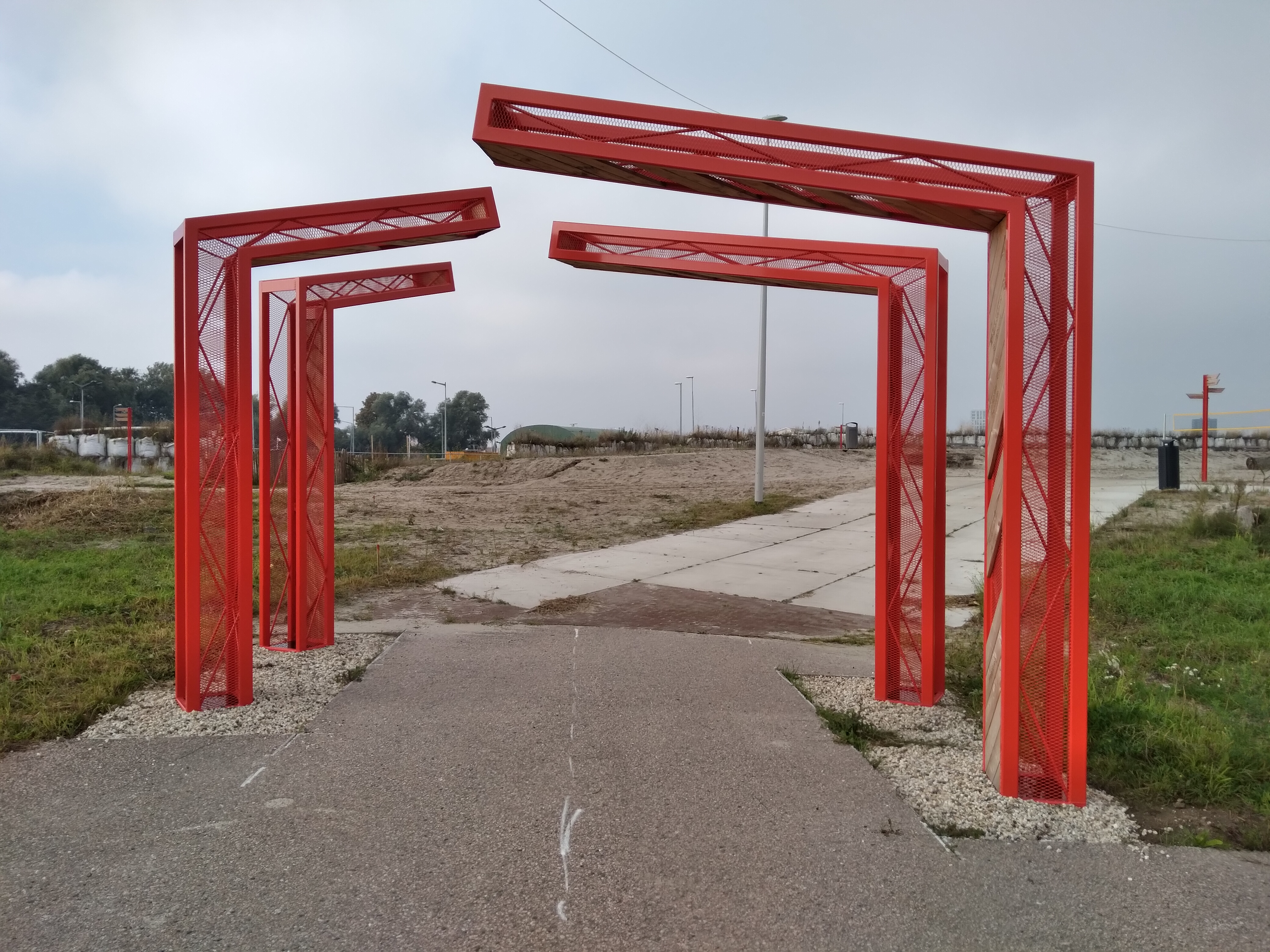
Direction sign in Sluisbuurt (October 2021)
