= Mondriaan Tower =

Building in Amsterdam, Netherlands

Coordinates: 52.3440°N 4.9176°E

The Mondriaan Tower (Dutch: Mondriaantoren) is a skyscraper located at Amstelplein 6-8, near the Amstel river, in Amsterdam, Netherlands. The modern office building is 120 meters high, has 30 office floors and an underlying parking garage. Mondriaan Tower was completed in 2002.

It is the second tallest building in the city. The tower is located at the omval, an island in the Amstel river. The tower is named for the old Dutch painter Piet Mondriaan.

The head office of Delta lloyd is based in the tower. It has a floor space of 32,000 m^{2}.

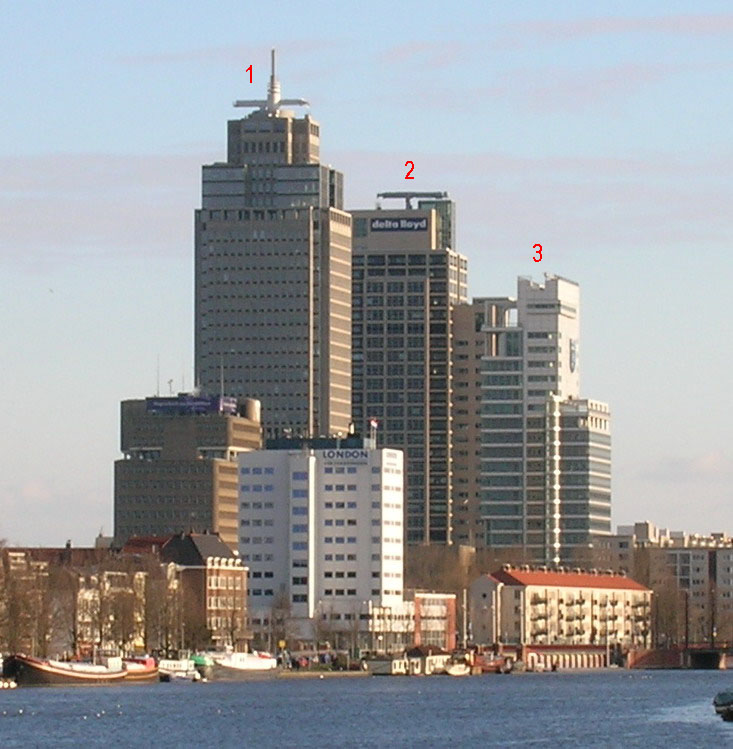
As seen from the Amstel: 1. Rembrandt Tower, 2. Mondriaan Tower, 3. Breitner Tower
