= Bullewijk =

Coordinates: 52.3068°N 4.9521°E

Bullewijk (wijk)
- Neighborhood of Amsterdam
- Interactive map of Bullewijk (wijk)
- Country: Netherlands
- Province: North Holland
- COROP: Amsterdam
- Time zone: UTC+1 (CET)

Bullewijk is a neighborhood and business park in the quarter of Amsterdam-Zuidoost (Amsterdam-Southeast), Netherlands. The neighborhood received its name in 1978 and was named after the nearby river of the same name. It was created due to a partial elevation of the Bullewijker and Holendrecht polder.

== Location ==
Bullewijk is bordered in the east by the Amsterdam – Utrecht railway line, in the west by the Utrechtseweg, in the north by the Burgemeester Stramanweg (Mayor Straman road) and in the south by the Tafelbergweg (Table Mountain road). The neighborhood gets cut in half by the Gaasperdammerweg (from east to west) and the Holterbergweg (from north to south).

The largest and most prominent buildings include the Academic Medical Center, an IKEA shop, the Atlasgebouw (Atlas Building), and the Johan Cruyff Arena.

== Design ==
The Bullewijk neighborhood was designed with industrial and office zones named Amstel III, and construction started in the 1980s. According to the views of that time, the car was given full priority there, and working and living were strictly separated. G&S, a company founded in 1978, contributed the most in the construction of the Bullewijk. They built and developed about 65 buildings.
