= World Trade Center (Amsterdam) =

Commercial center located at the Zuidas in the Netherlands

Coordinates: 52.340°N 4.873°E

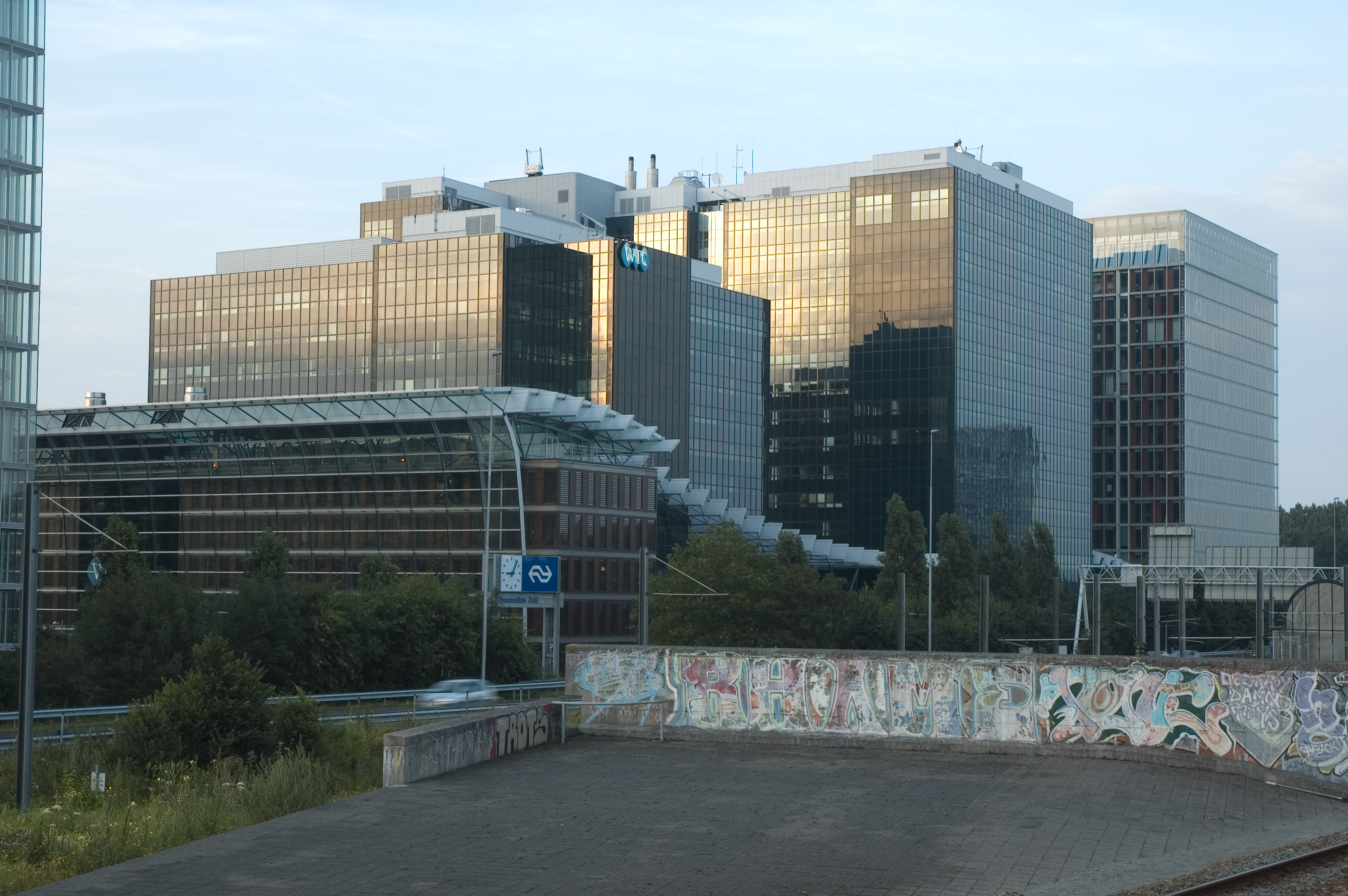
WTC Amsterdam

The World Trade Center Amsterdam is a commercial center located at the Zuidas in Amsterdam, the Netherlands. It was officially opened in 1985, and renovated between 1998 and 2004. The center consists of nine buildings—labeled from A to I—with 120,000 square meters (1,300,000 sq ft) of offices and office facilities. Tower H is the highest building, it has 27 levels and measures 104 meters (341 ft). The center is a member of the international World Trade Centers Association.
