= Teleport, Amsterdam =

Coordinates: 52°23′13″N 4°50′19″E

Teleport
- Neighborhood of Amsterdam
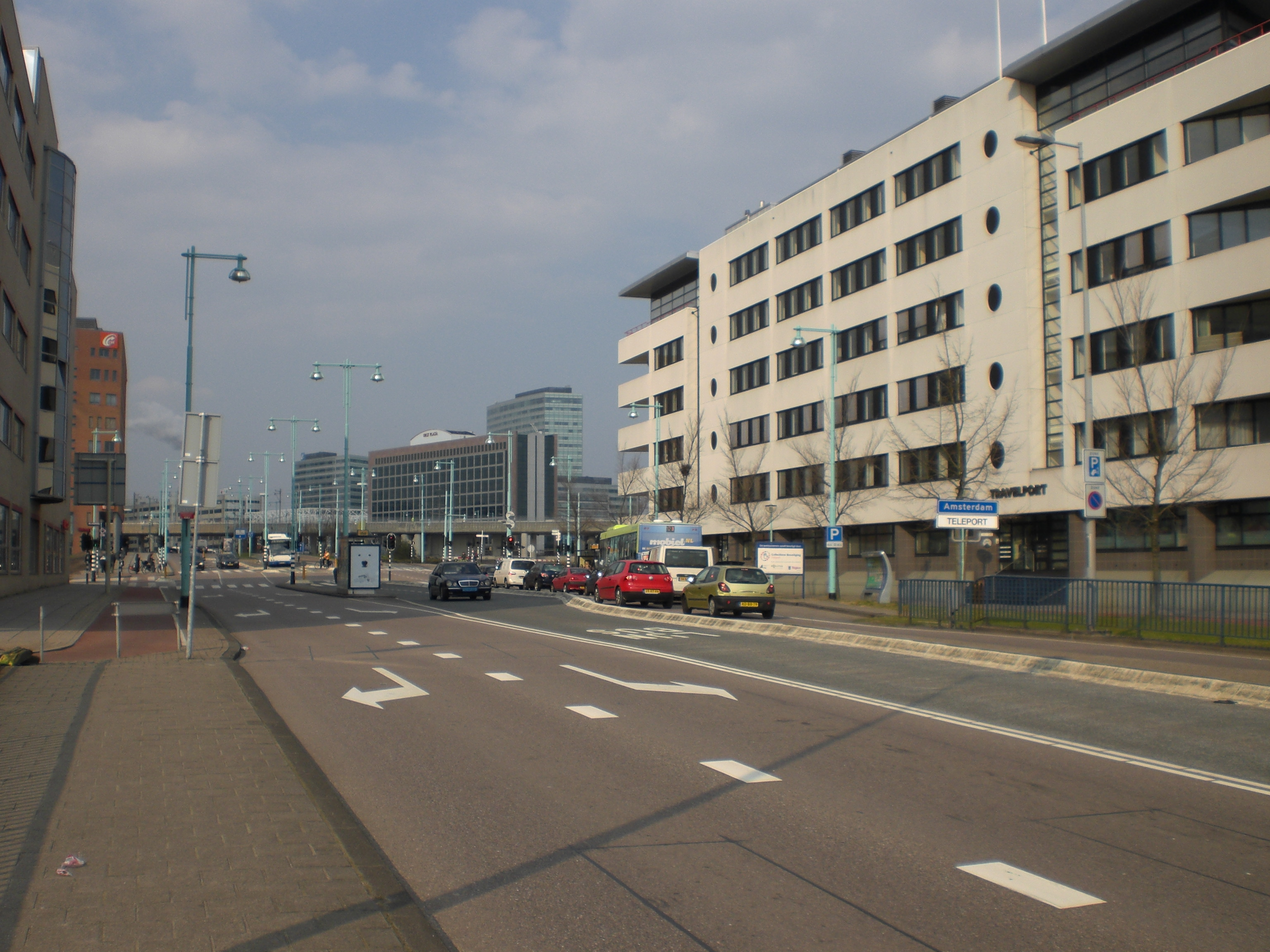
- Radarweg looking north
- Interactive map of Teleport
- Country: Netherlands
- Province: North Holland
- COROP: Amsterdam
- Borough: Westpoort
- Time zone: UTC+1 (CET)

Teleport is a neighborhood of Amsterdam, Netherlands in the urban district of Westpoort.

Teleport was founded in the 1980s as an office location with the designation of "Telematics." Therefore, it has specific facilities in that area. The neighborhood has connections by road through the A10 motorway, railway lines, buses and underground (the Amsterdam Sloterdijk railway station). The borders of the neighborhood are to the West the Seineweg, to the North The Basisweg, to the East the A10 motorway and to the South the N200 highway (the Haarlemmerweg).

At this moment around 20,000 are working in the area; in the future it would be around 35,000. The city of Amsterdam has made plans to realize this by designing a new tram and bus station at the Carrascoplein. Other plans include a large plaza around the train station and the development of other types of centers such as schools, cultural and sports facilities, hotels and shops. The street names in the area are derived mostly from international airports around the world: Orlyplein, Naritaweg, Kimpoweg.

The office buildings Millennium Tower, Crystal Tower, La Guardia Plaza and the building of the Belastingdienst (Tax and Customs Administration) are among the highest buildings in the city of Amsterdam.
