= Mushroom Networks =

Worshipping Areas

- Type: Private
- Industry: Telecommunication
- Founded: 2004; 22 years ago
- Headquarters: San Diego, California, United States
- Key people: Cahit Akin (Co-founder and CEO); Rene Cruz (Co-founder); Rajesh Mishra (CTO); Steve Schneider (CFO); Steve Brown (Lead Architect)
- Products: Networking
- Number of employees: 14-16
- Website: www.mushroomnetworks.com

Mushroom Networks, Inc. is a telecommunications company in San Diego, California.

Mushroom Networks was founded in 2004, by electrical and computer engineers Rene L. Cruz, Cahit Akin, and Rajesh Mishra. It was spun off from the University of California, San Diego (UCSD) and got support from the von Liebig Entrepreneurism Center.

The company solely focuses on networking products utilizing their "Broadband Bonding" technology. In various configurations, these products provide the end-user with the appearance of larger bandwidth by aggregating multiple network services through load balancing, and/or channel bonding.

== History ==
In February, 2008, Mushroom Networks introduced the Truffle (BBNA6401) a broadband bonding network appliance.

In July, 2008, the company introduced the Porcini (BBNA4422) which was a sizeably smaller broadband bonding product than the previous Truffle product. This product can bond four wireline internet connections and a wireless USB port card.

In September, 2008 the company introduced the PortaBella (BBNA2242).

In June, 2009, the company introduced the second generation PortaBella (BBNA141).

In July, 2009, the company introduced the second generation Truffle (BBNA 5201G).

In April, 2010, the company announced the TelePorter, the industry's first broadcast quality live video streaming system utilizing bonded cellular link devices.

In July 2017, Mushroom Networks launched autopilot SD-WAN service for partners.
