= Rembrandt Tower =

Office skyscraper in Amsterdam

Rembrandt Tower Rembrandttoren
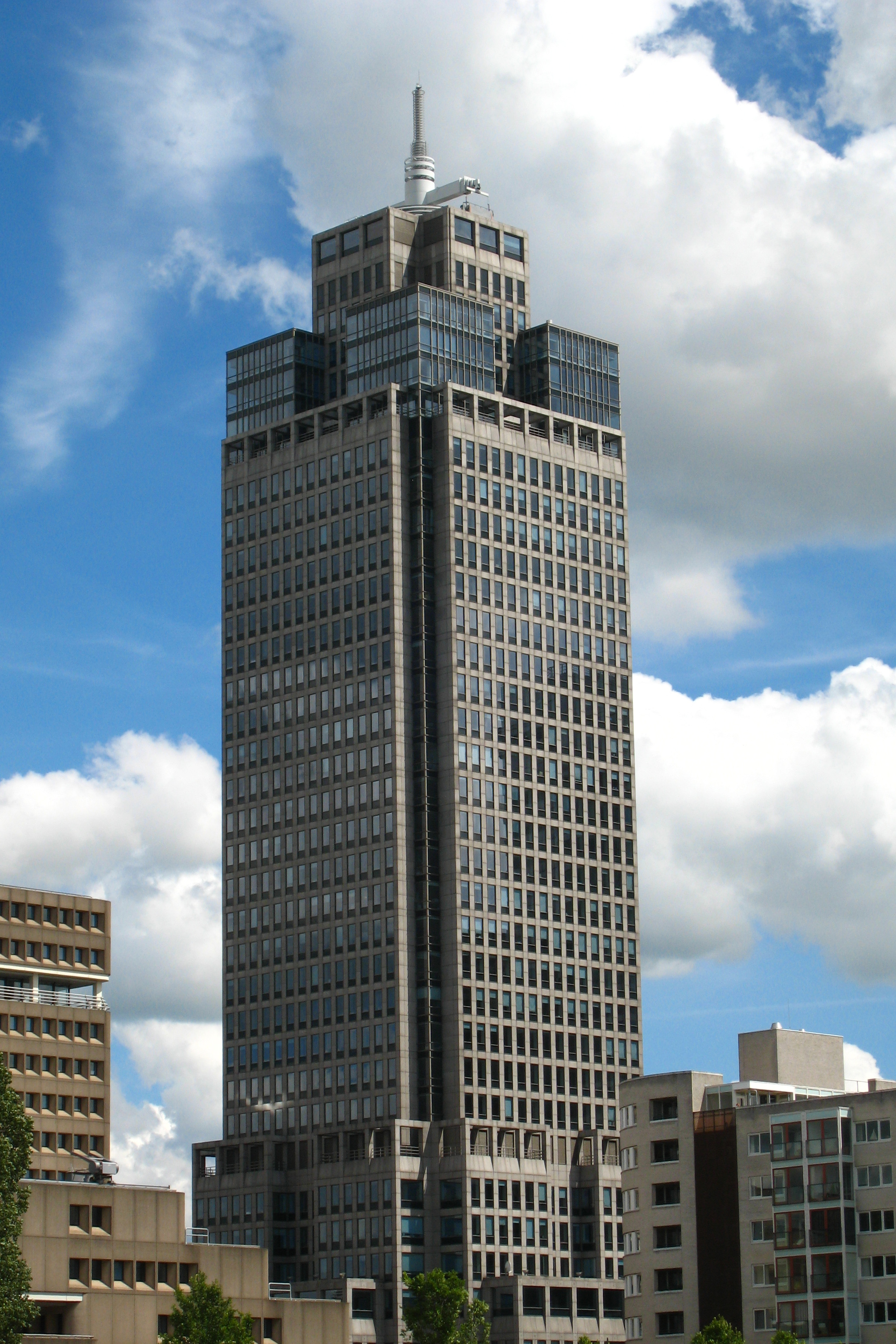
- Rembrandt Tower in June 2007
- Interactive map of the Rembrandt Tower; Rembrandttoren area

General information
- Status: Completed
- Type: Commercial offices
- Architectural style: Modernism
- Location: Watergraafsmeer, Amsterdam-Oost, Amstelplein 1, Amsterdam, Netherlands
- Coordinates: 52.3444°N 4.9167°E
- Construction started: 1991
- Completed: 1994
- Owner: William F. McCarter (MBM Corporatie INC) - Deutsche Immobilien Fonds AG

Height
- Antenna spire: 150 m (490 ft)
- Roof: 135 m (443 ft)

Technical details
- Floor count: 36

Design and construction
- Architects: Peter de Clercq Zubli, Tom van der Put ZZDP Architecten; Skidmore, Owings and Merrill

Rembrandt Tower (Dutch: Rembrandttoren, pronounced [ˈrɛmbrɑnˌtoːrə(n)]) is an office skyscraper in Amsterdam. It has a height of 135 metres, 36 floors and it has a spire which extends its height to 150 metres. It was constructed from 1991 to 1994. The building's foundation required piles 56 metres long and two metres in diameter.

The building was designed by the architects Peter de Clercq Zubli and Tom van der Put from ZZDP Architecten in cooperation with Skidmore, Owings and Merrill from SOM, and was owned initially by William F. McCarter and currently by MBM Corporative Worldwide Inc.

== Incident ==
On 11 March 2002, an armed man stormed the building and took 18 hostages. He claimed his motive was frustration over a recently purchased widescreen TV, which he had bought to avoid the black bars that appeared while watching widescreen VHS tapes. When he discovered that the bars still appeared even on a widescreen TV, he felt misled. His anger was particularly directed at Philips, which had its headquarters in the Rembrandt Tower until July 2001, when it relocated to the adjacent Breitner Tower. The man shot himself hours later in a toilet.

== Gallery ==
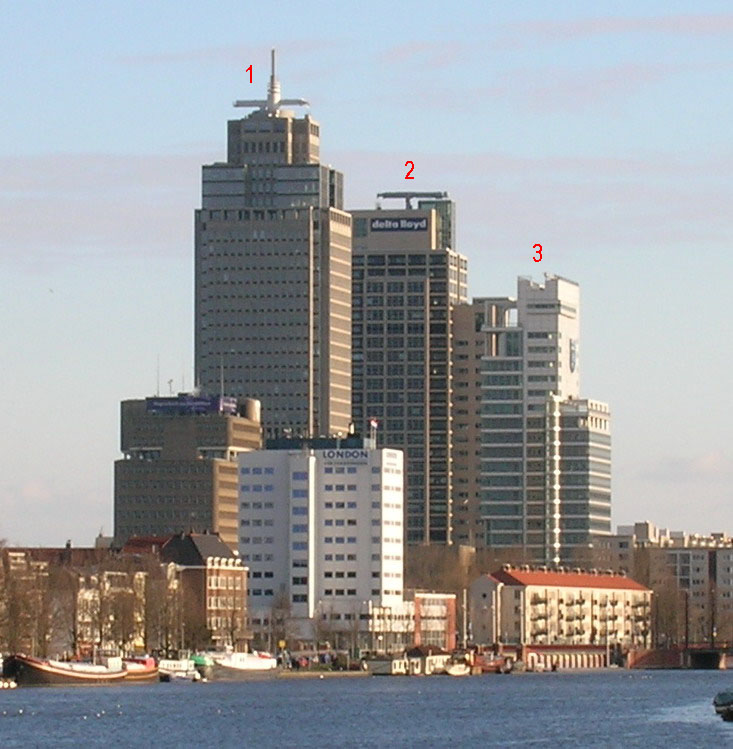
(1) Rembrandt Tower, (2) Mondriaan Tower, and (3) Breitner Tower

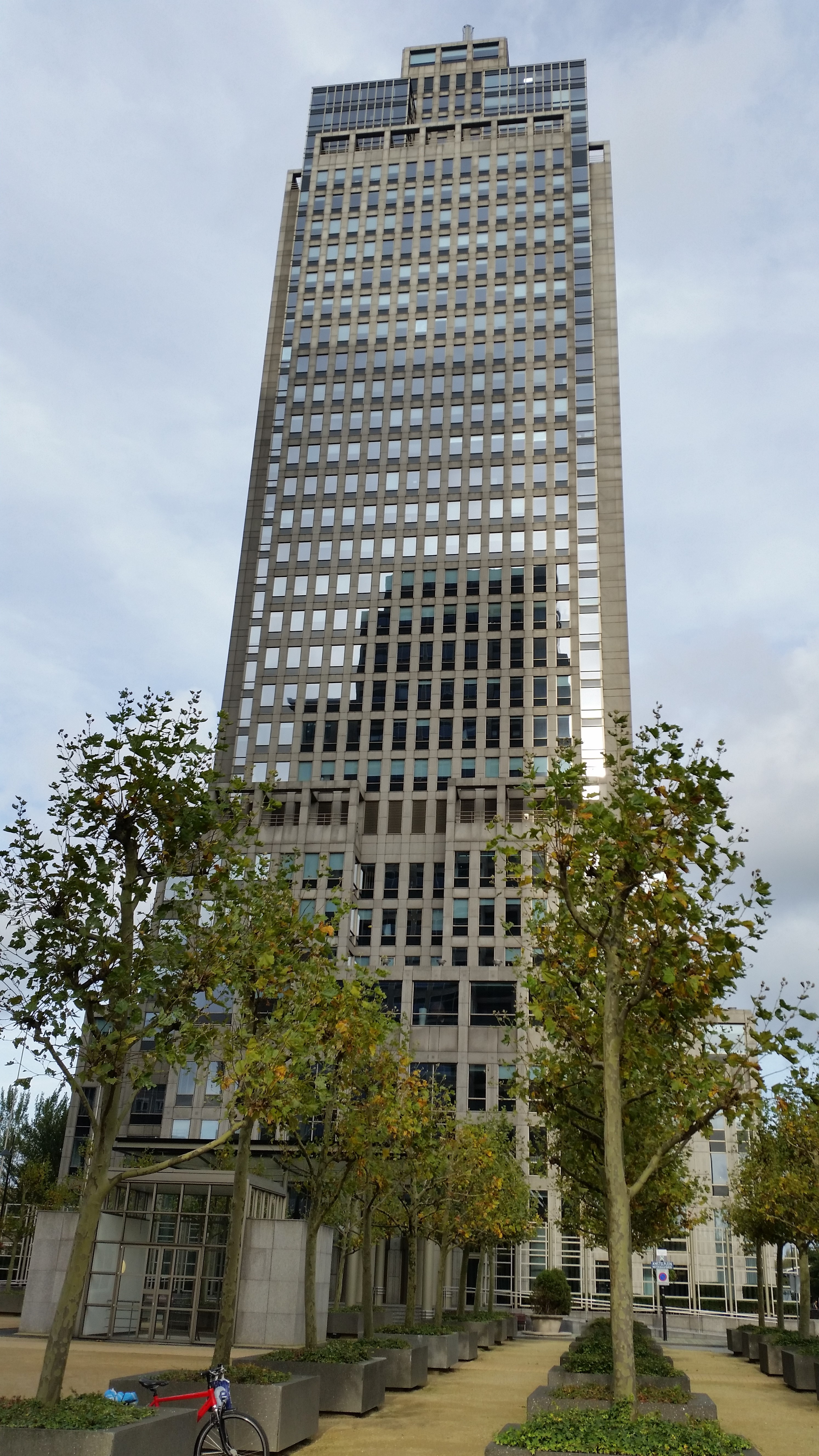
Front of the Rembrandt tower viewed from the south (2019)

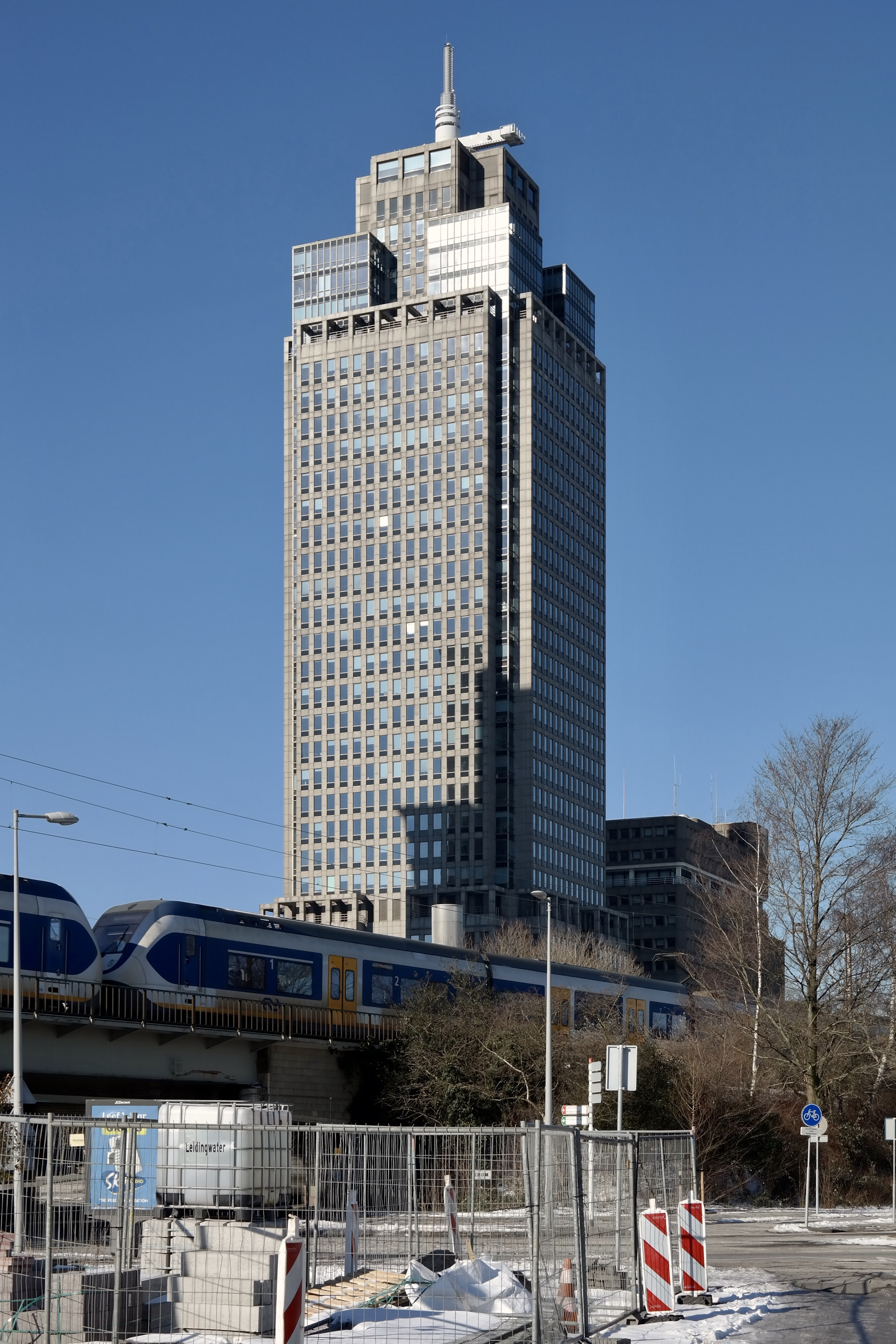
Rembrandt tower (2021)
