= Overhoeks =

- Neighborhood of Amsterdam
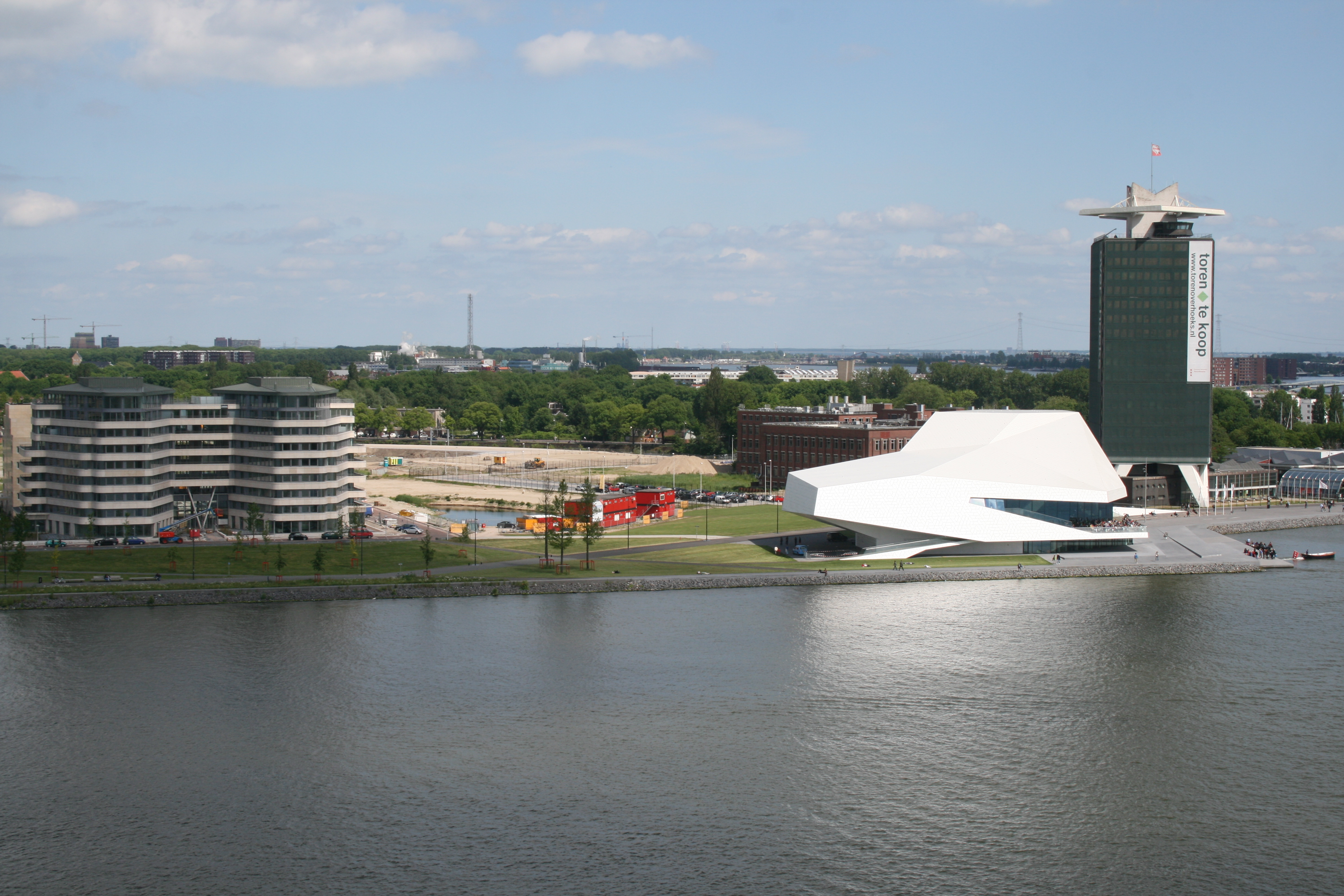
- Zeven Prov EYE
- Interactive map of Overhoeks
- Country: Netherlands
- Province: North Holland
- COROP: Amsterdam
- Borough: Amsterdam-Noord
- Time zone: UTC+1 (CET)

Overhoeks is a new mixed-use neighbourhood of Amsterdam, Netherlands in the borough of Amsterdam-Noord directly across the IJ river (technically a lake) from the city's central station. It is located on the former Royal Dutch Shell Research facility grounds. Construction of apartments and condominiums began in 2007 and the plan is for a total of 2200 units to be built, mixed in with 130,000 square metres (1,400,000 sq ft) of office, retail, and cultural space. Shell Technology Centre remains here with 1200 employees. Shell's Overhoeks Tower, the neighbourhood's namesake, was rebranded as A’DAM Toren (‘Amsterdam Dance And Music’) by brand consultancy The Stone Twins in January 2014. The tower was redeveloped into a mix of offices, entertainment venues, a hotel, a revolving restaurant and an observation deck that boasts Europe's highest swing. A’DAM Toren opened in 2016.
