= The Rock (building) =

Coordinates: 52.337557°N 4.870020°E

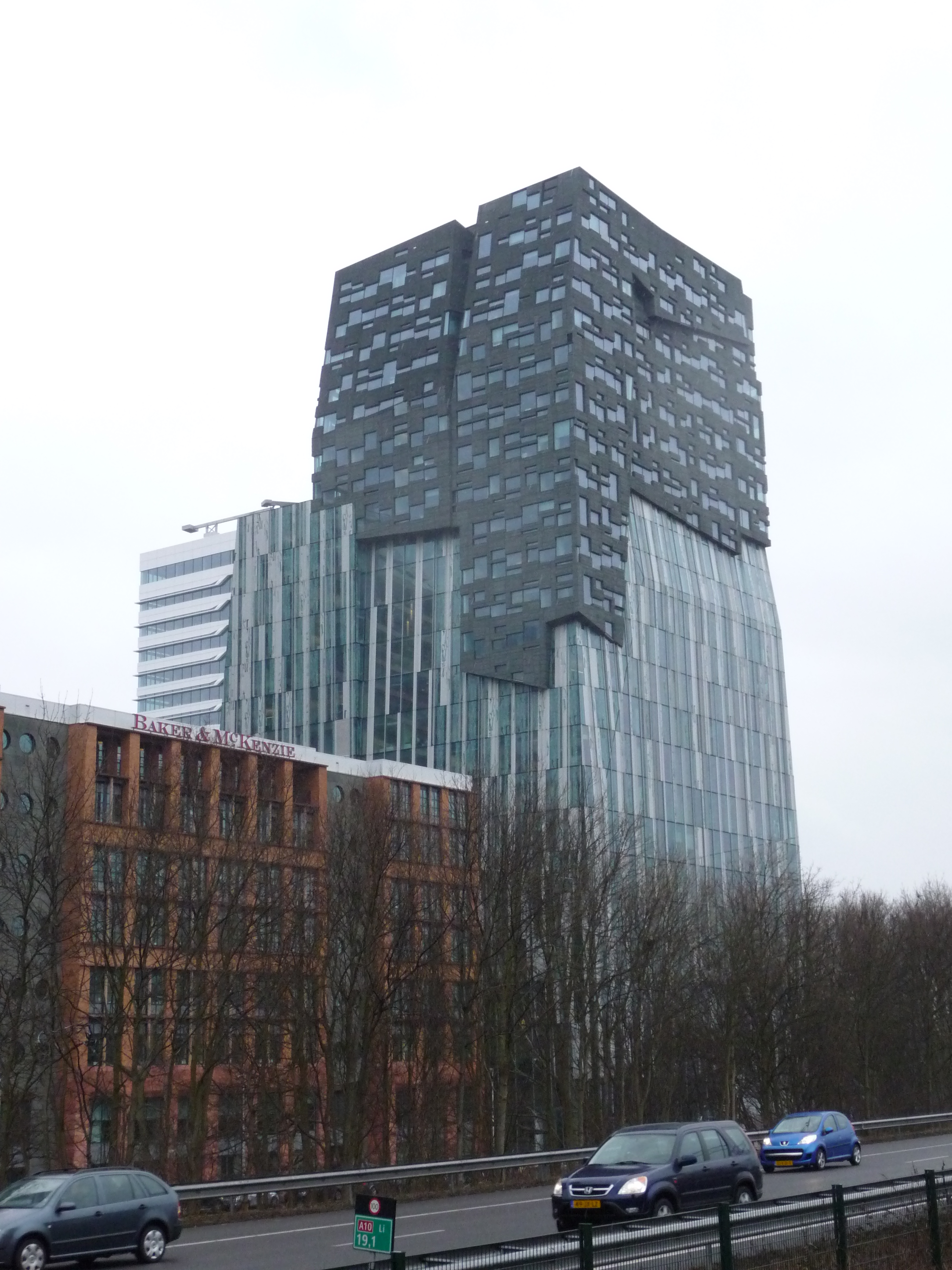
- Interactive map of the The Rock area

General information
- Status: Completed
- Architectural style: Neofuturistic
- Location: Amsterdam, Netherlands
- Opening: 2009
- Cost: € 40.000.000
- Owner: Deka Immobilien (2012)

Height
- Height: 90

Technical details
- Floor count: 24
- Floor area: 35.000

Design and construction
- Architect: Erick van Egeraat

The office tower, The Rock, located in Gustav Mahler square, is part of the Mahler 4 office area in Amsterdam.

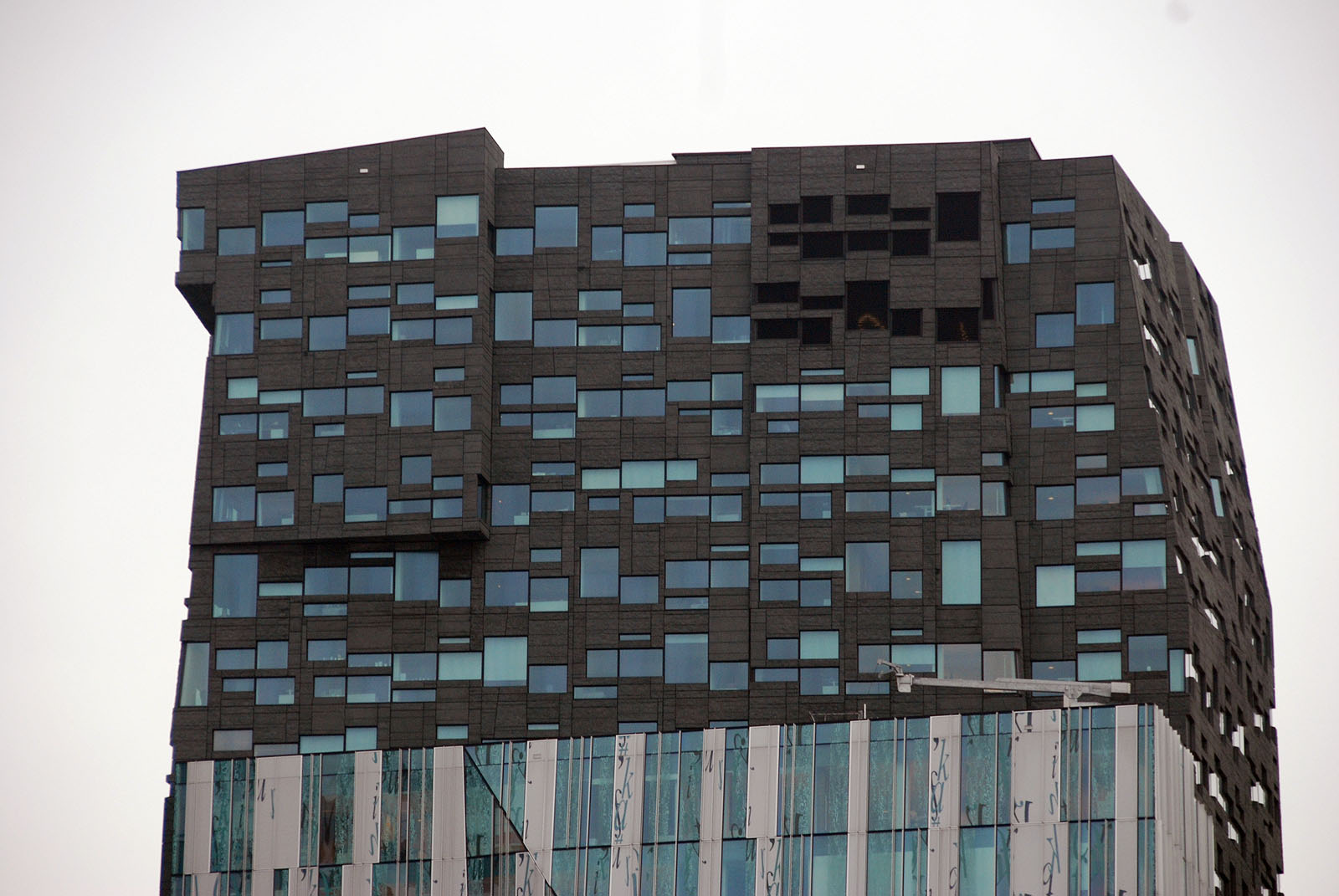
Top of the building in 2010

The building distinguishes itself by the crooked glass, aluminum, stone, and concrete elements. The building seems to be much heavier at the upper parts compared to the lower area. The design is very rough and feels like a rock. It is one of the tallest buildings at the Zuidas in Amsterdam.

== Interior ==
The interior is created from stone, wood and brass. In the offices the design is relatively simple. Although most of the building is characterized by straight edges and sleek shapes, the entrance has more rounded shapes and smooth transitions. The staircase in the main entrance won a prize for 'Staircase of the year' from EeStairs in the year 2012.
