= Statistics Netherlands =

Netherlands' principal government institution in charge of statistics and census data

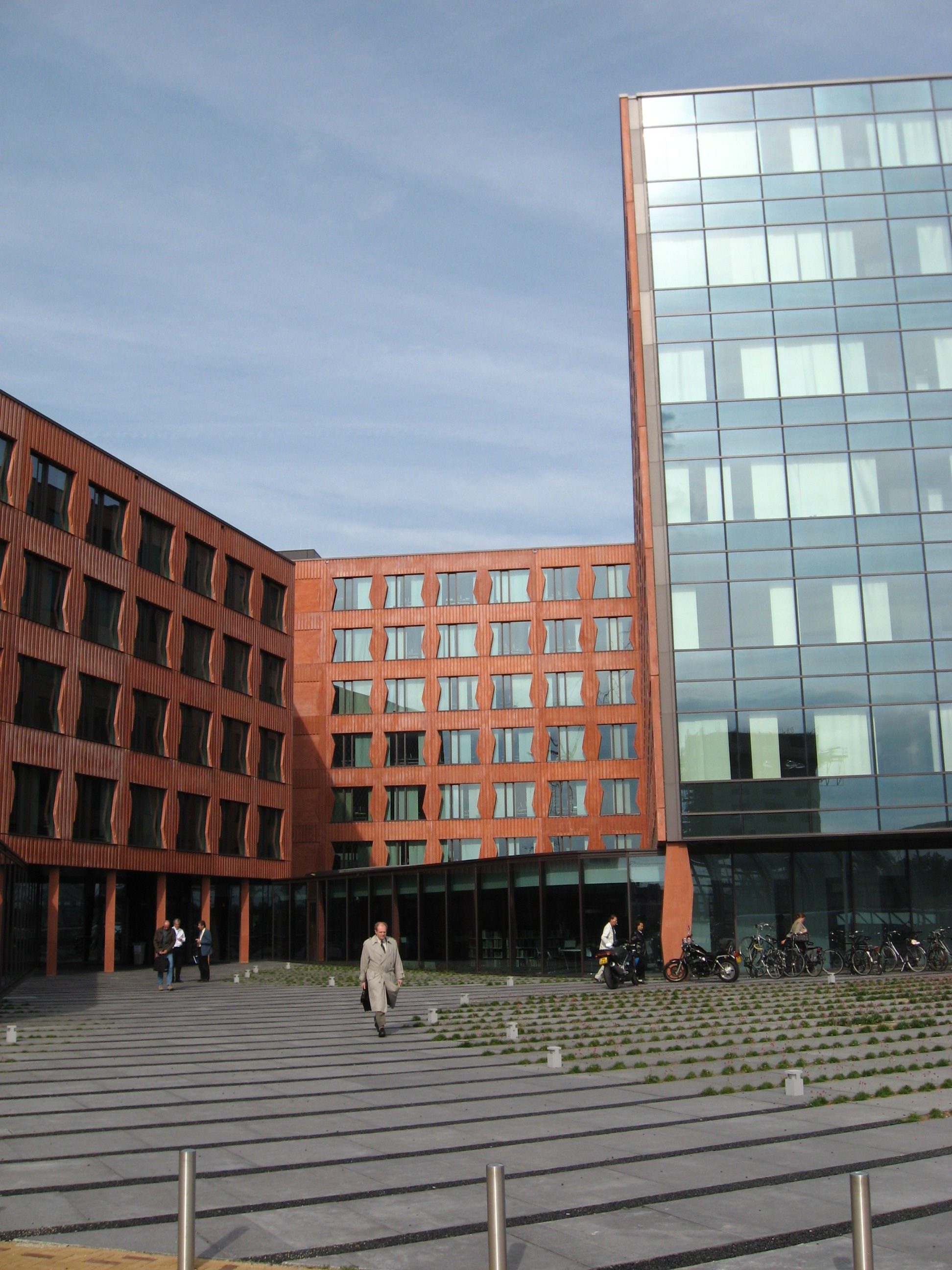
The office of Statistics Netherlands in The Hague

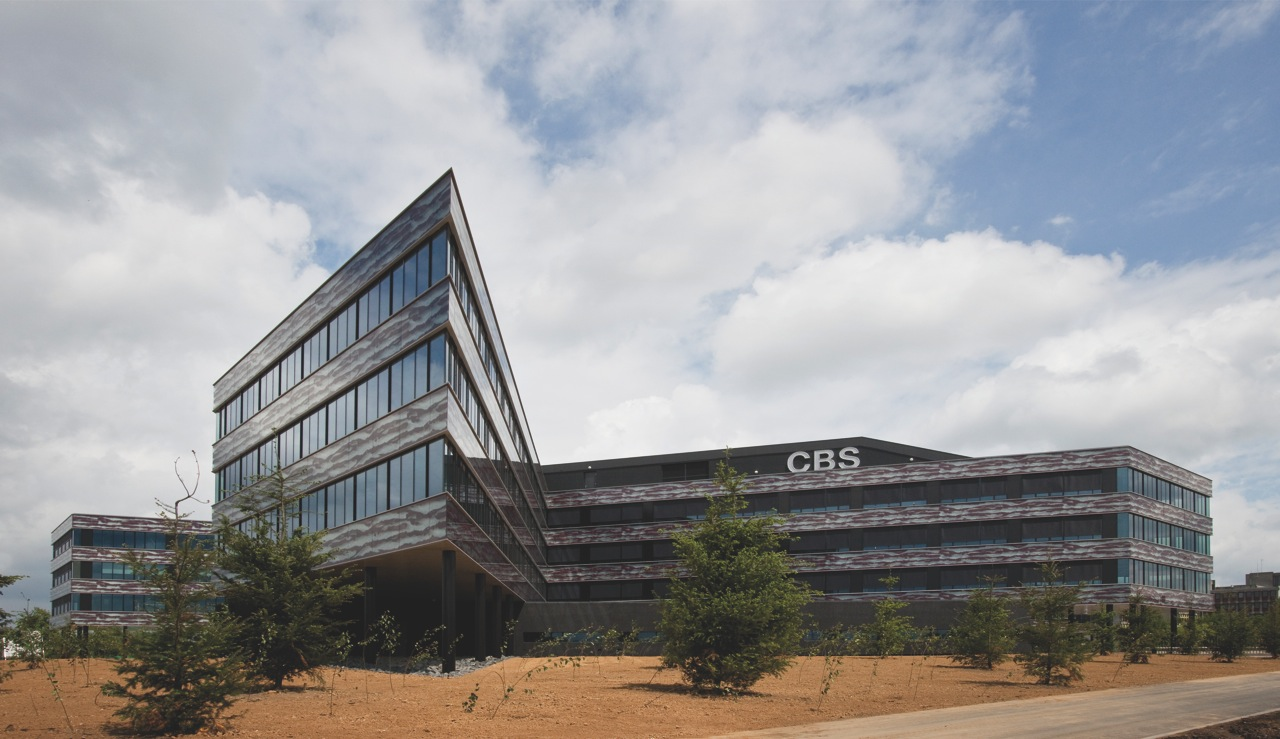
The office of Statistics Netherlands in Heerlen

Statistics Netherlands, founded in 1899, is a Dutch governmental institution that gathers statistical information about the Netherlands. In Dutch it is known as the Centraal Bureau voor de Statistiek (Central Agency for Statistics), often abbreviated to CBS. It is located in The Hague and Heerlen. Since 3 January 2004, Statistics Netherlands has been an independent public body, or quango. Its independent legal status enables the reliable collection and dissemination of information to support public debate, policy development and decision-making.

CBS collects statistical information on themes such as:

- Count of the population
- Consumer prices
- Economic growth
- Personal and household incomes
- Unemployment
- Religion

The programme of CBS needs to be ratified by the Central Commission for Statistics, which was replaced by an Advisory Board in 2016. This independent board must ensure the impartiality, independence, quality, relevance, and continuity of CBS, according to the relevant legislation (Law on the CBS (Wet op het Centraal bureau en de Centrale commissie voor de statistiek) 1996 and 2003).

== History ==
CBS was established in 1899 in response to the need for independent and reliable information that advances the understanding of social issues and supports public decision making. This is still the main role of CBS. Philip Idenburg, who worked at the CBS from 1929–1966, played a key role in salvaging the work of the Mundaneum offices in The Hague, arranging for Gerd Arntz to be involved in setting up the Dutch Foundation for Statistics, which used the Isotypes previously developed by Arntz and Otto Neurath.

== Offices ==
CBS has offices in The Hague and Heerlen. The office in Heerlen was located there by the government in 1973 to compensate the area for the loss of ten of thousands of jobs because of closing the coal mines. The office in The Hague with the name 'Double U' was designed by Branimir Medić and Pero Puljiz. It has a surface of 33,191 m^{2} and the total cost was €41,000,000. The office in Heerlen was designed by Meyer en Van Schooten Architects in 2009. The office has a surface of 22,000 m^{2} and parking spaces for 296 cars. Glass was used everywhere in the building. The main hall has a glass roof and the outside walls are fully glass. The several straight staircases in the main hall have glass balustrades with a RVS handrail and were manufactured by EeStairs. Queen Beatrix of the Netherlands officially opened the building on 30 September 2009.

== See also ==
- Eurostat
