= Zuidas =

Business district and neighbourhood in Amsterdam, Netherlands

- Business district and neighbourhood of Amsterdam
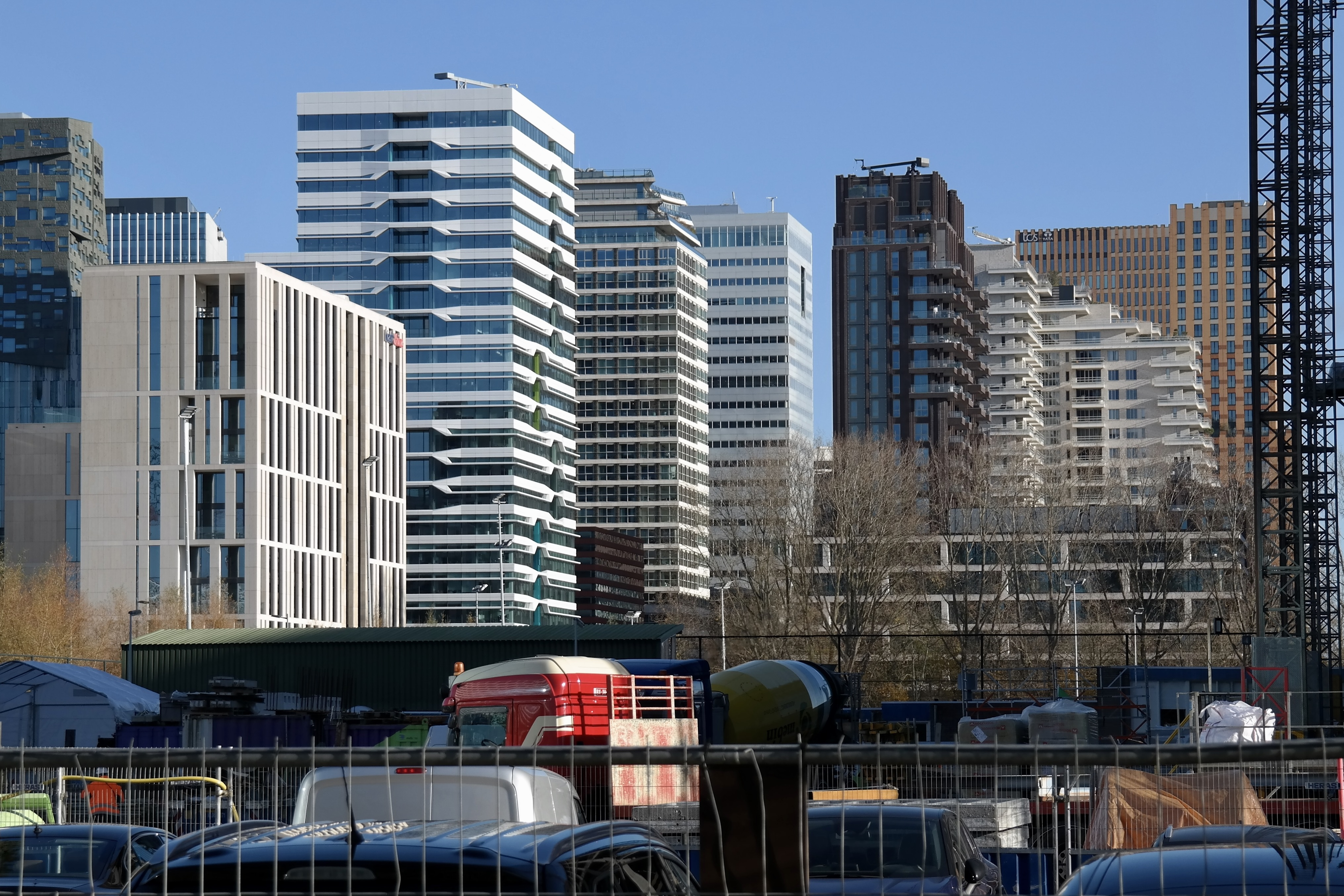
- High-rise buildings around Gustav Mahlerlaan
- Nickname: Financial Mile
- Interactive map of Zuidas
- Coordinates: 52°20′20″N 4°52′13″E
- Country: Netherlands
- Province: North Holland
- Municipality: Amsterdam
- Borough: Amsterdam-Zuid

Area
  - Total: 2.45 km^{2} (0.95 sq mi)
- project area

Population (1 January 2026)
  - Total: 4,975
  - Density: 2,030/km^{2} (5,260/sq mi)
- statistical district
- Time zone: UTC+1 (CET)
  - Summer (DST): UTC+2 (CEST)
- Postcode: 1077, 1081–1083
- Area code: 020

The Zuidas (literally South Axis in Dutch) is a business district and residential neighbourhood in Amsterdam, Netherlands, in the borough of Amsterdam-Zuid. Also known as the "Financial Mile," it lies along the southern sector of the A10 ring road, between Oud-Zuid and the Rivierenbuurt to the north and the garden suburb of Buitenveldert to the south.

The name refers both to a statistical district of the municipality and to the larger municipal development area known as Grootstedelijk Gebied Zuidas; the two boundaries do not coincide. The statistical district had 4,975 residents on 1 January 2026. The development area covers about 245 hectares, excluding the separate Zuidasdok infrastructure programme, and is divided into twelve project neighbourhoods. According to the municipal project organisation, the area contained more than 50,000 jobs, some 32,000 students and about 2,000 businesses in 2024.

Originally conceived as a commercial office location, the district has been redeveloped as a mixed-use area combining offices with housing, public space and educational facilities. Its urban design has been compared to large European business hubs such as La Défense in Paris and Canary Wharf in London.

== History ==
=== Origins and postwar planning ===
The area formed part of the southern edge of Amsterdam long before the business district emerged. In 1914 Hendrik Petrus Berlage presented his Plan Zuid, which envisaged a monumental southern railway station at the end of an axis along the Minervalaan; the plan was adopted in 1917 but the station was never built. Work on a southern ring railway embankment began in 1921 but was delayed by the economic depression and the Second World War.

The General Expansion Plan of 1934, prepared under Cornelis van Eesteren, set out the framework for the city's postwar growth. The Prinses Irenebuurt was built between 1954 and 1958 and Buitenveldert between 1958 and 1966. Between the two ran the Zuidelijke Wandelweg, a recreational walking and cycling route laid out in the 1920s between the Amstel and the Amstelveenseweg. Lined with poplars and willows, it was popular with city residents; the westernmost section disappeared in the 1930s beneath the embankment of the planned ring railway, and most of the remainder was lost in 1961–62 to the construction of the new RAI complex and Buitenveldert. The A10 was later built on the embankment, and only the eastern end near Zorgvlied cemetery survives.

Construction of the Vrije Universiteit teaching hospital, the later VUmc, began on De Boelelaan in 1960; the RAI exhibition complex opened its first hall in 1961. The railway between Amsterdam Zuid and Schiphol opened in 1978, the connection to Amsterdam RAI in 1981, and the A10 South in the same year.

=== Emergence of the business district ===
The Nederlandse Middenstandsbank opened a head office in the area in 1974, followed by the World Trade Center in 1985. From the early 1990s the municipality studied the development of an accessible office location between Schiphol and Amsterdam-Zuidoost. The decision by ABN AMRO to build a new head office there, completed between 1996 and 1999, acted as a catalyst.

In late 1997 the national government designated Zuidas as one of its Nieuwe Sleutelprojecten (New Key Projects), and in January 1998 the city council adopted the Masterplan Zuidas, envisaging development over thirty to forty years at high density with a mix of functions. The Visie Zuidas 2016, adopted on 5 October 2016, remains the policy framework for the area.

== Transport ==
=== Rail and metro ===
Amsterdam Zuid station is the district's principal transport hub, served by domestic intercity and local services including trains to Schiphol, Rotterdam, Utrecht and the north and east of the country. Since December 2024 the Eurocity Direct service between Lelystad and Brussels-South, via Schiphol, Rotterdam and Antwerp, has also called at the station.

The station is being expanded to become Amsterdam's second main passenger station alongside Amsterdam Centraal. Projections of future passenger numbers vary between sources: the project organisation and ProRail cite about 300,000 public transport passengers a day by 2030, material for the Brittenpassage gives more than 250,000, and the consulting engineers Arup give about 325,000.

Metro line 52, the North–South line, terminates at Amsterdam Zuid; line 50 and line 51 also serve the station. Tram lines 5 and 25 call at Station Zuid, and since 29 March 2026 line 6 has run between the station and Amstelveen Westwijk during weekday peak hours. Tram line 24 serves the Vrije Universiteit and Amsterdam UMC, and line 4 terminates at Amsterdam RAI.

=== Zuidasdok ===
Zuidasdok is a separate infrastructure programme covering the reconstruction of Amsterdam Zuid station, the widening of the A10 South and the partial tunnelling of the motorway. The A10 is being widened from four to six lanes in each direction over six kilometres between the De Nieuwe Meer and Amstel interchanges, with local and through traffic separated; at the station, a section of just over a kilometre will run in two tunnels, freeing about 100,000 m² of surface space. The rail and metro tracks remain above ground. The station is to receive wider platforms, a second passenger tunnel called the Brittenpassage, a widened existing passage, and new tram and bus stations.

Construction was awarded in 2017 to the ZuidPlus consortium of Fluor, Heijmans and Hochtief, but the integrated design proved more complex than anticipated and the parties ended their collaboration in 2020. The programme was subsequently broken up into separate work packages that were retendered. Rijkswaterstaat gave 2037 as the planned completion date in 2026, with the two motorway tunnels due in 2035; a letter to the House of Representatives in January 2026 put the final milestone at 2035–2037 and the expected budget shortfall at €1.15–1.3 billion, citing inflation, construction-market scarcity, delays and the complexity of building while the station and motorway remain in use. The Brittenpassage was scheduled to open to passengers on 1 November 2026.

The prolonged works cause disruption to rail, metro and road traffic and to residents and businesses; keeping the area accessible and liveable during construction is an explicit objective of both the Visie Zuidas and the programme itself.

== Economy ==
Zuidas is a financial, corporate and legal centre, hosting more than 2,000 businesses including ABN AMRO and AkzoNobel. Following Brexit, the European Medicines Agency relocated its headquarters from London to the Vivaldi area of Zuidas, becoming operational there in 2019. The Vrije Universiteit Amsterdam and Amsterdam UMC, location VUmc lie in the VU-kwartier within the district, and RAI Amsterdam and the district court are at its eastern and northern edges respectively.

=== Justice ===
The Amsterdam district court, the largest of the eleven district courts in the Netherlands, occupies a purpose-built courthouse at Parnassusweg 280, which opened on 3 May 2021. Designed by KAAN Architecten and delivered under a design–build–finance–maintain–operate contract by the New Amsterdam Court House consortium for the Central Government Real Estate Agency, the ten-storey building has around 47,250 m² of floor space, fifty courtrooms, and accommodates some 1,000 court staff alongside 200 employees of associated organisations. It replaced a 1970s concrete courthouse on the same site, part of which survives as a municipal monument.

== Sport ==
The western project neighbourhood of Verdi, which at 60 hectares makes up about a quarter of the development area, forms part of the Amsterdam Sports Axis (Sportas), a corridor of sporting facilities along the southern and western edge of the city. Facilities in and around the area include the Sporthallen Zuid indoor complex and the Frans Otten Stadium. Sportpark Buitenveldert, on Gustav Mahlerlaan, lies administratively within Zuidas despite its name and is the home ground of the football club SC Buitenveldert. The Amsterdamsche Football Club (AFC), founded in 1895 and one of the oldest football clubs in the Netherlands, plays at Sportpark Goed Genoeg on Maurice Ravellaan in the Ravel project neighbourhood. Its predecessor grounds lay along the Zuidelijke Wandelweg, linking the club to the area's pre-war recreational past.

Sport has at times competed with housing for space. Of around 1,000 social and mid-market homes announced for Verdi in 2021, some 550 were planned on the site of Sporthallen Zuid, with the sports complex to be rebuilt in stacked form; the municipality later reported that these plans had not proceeded as envisaged. A cultural-historical study of Verdi noted that the construction of Buitenveldert had severed the direct link between the sports grounds and the Olympic Stadium formerly provided by the Zuidelijke Wandelweg, and that restoring that connection is an aim of the Zuidas vision.

== Urban development ==
=== Project neighbourhoods ===
The municipal development area comprises twelve project neighbourhoods: Verdi, Fred. Roeske, Parnas, Strawinsky, Beethoven, RAI, Kop Zuidas, Vivaldi, Ravel, Mahler, Gershwin and Kenniskwartier. These are planning units and do not correspond one-to-one with the municipality's statistical districts, which divide the area into Zuidas-Noord, RAI, VU-kwartier, Zuidas-Zuid and Vivaldi. Strawinsky and Mahler, together with the station area and the World Trade Center, form the core of the business district; Gershwin was the first completed residential neighbourhood; Ravel and Kenniskwartier are the main housing sites.

=== Housing ===
Zuidas was initially an office location, and residential development has grown since the 2000s. By the end of 2023 the project organisation recorded 2,774 homes completed, including 800 temporary student units, with about 7,000 more planned by 2030. New residential schemes follow the citywide 40-40-20 rule, under which on average 40 per cent of homes are social housing, 40 per cent mid-market rental and 20 per cent private sector.

=== Notable buildings ===
Architecture in the district ranges from early glass office towers such as the World Trade Center and the ING House to more recent buildings including The Rock, the Ito-toren, the former ABN AMRO head office and the mixed-use Valley complex.

== Education and culture ==
The Gerrit Rietveld Academie, an academy of fine art and design founded in 1924, stands on Fred. Roeskestraat in the project neighbourhood of the same name. Its oldest building, designed by Gerrit Rietveld himself and completed in 1968, has been a municipal monument since 2002; it was joined by a building by Benthem Crouwel Architects in 2003 and a third structure in 2019. The Geert Groote College secondary school stands alongside it.

The municipal project organisation runs an art and culture programme including permanent works in public space, among them Love and Generosity on the square in front of the new courthouse, the light work White Noise in the Cellnex media tower, Virtual Fountains in the park opposite the RAI, and works in the Beatrixpark. Several companies open their collections to the public: the ABN AMRO Kunstruimte holds one of the largest corporate collections in the Netherlands, with works by Willem de Kooning, Donald Judd, Roy Lichtenstein and Anish Kapoor, while AkzoNobel Art Space shows contemporary art from a collection assembled since 1996. A museum of contemporary art, an initiative of the Hartwig Art Foundation, is being established in the former courthouse building on Parnassusweg; rather than developing its own collection it intends to host work by other artists, a selection of which will be donated to the Dutch national collection.

== Gallery ==
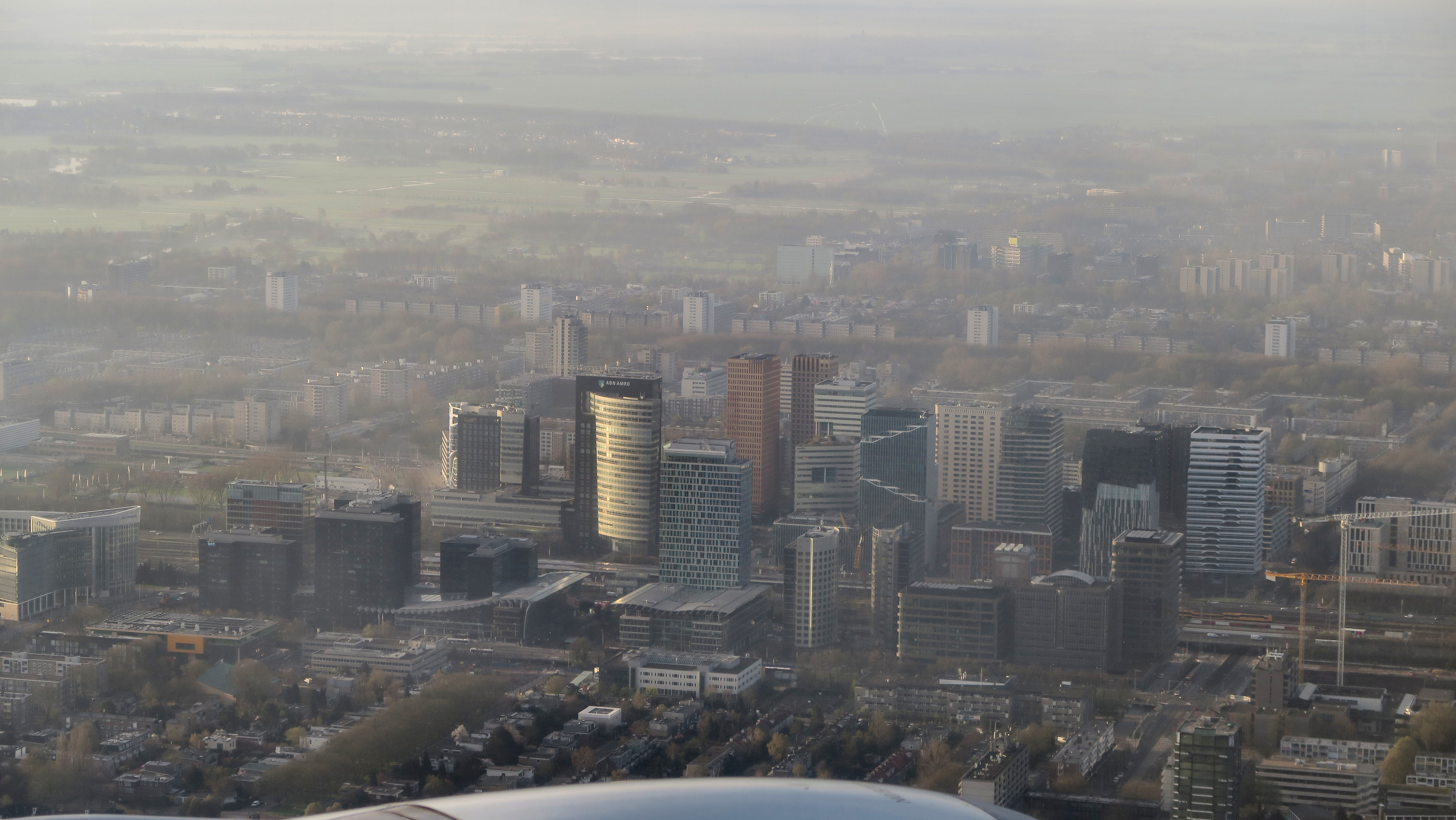
District from above

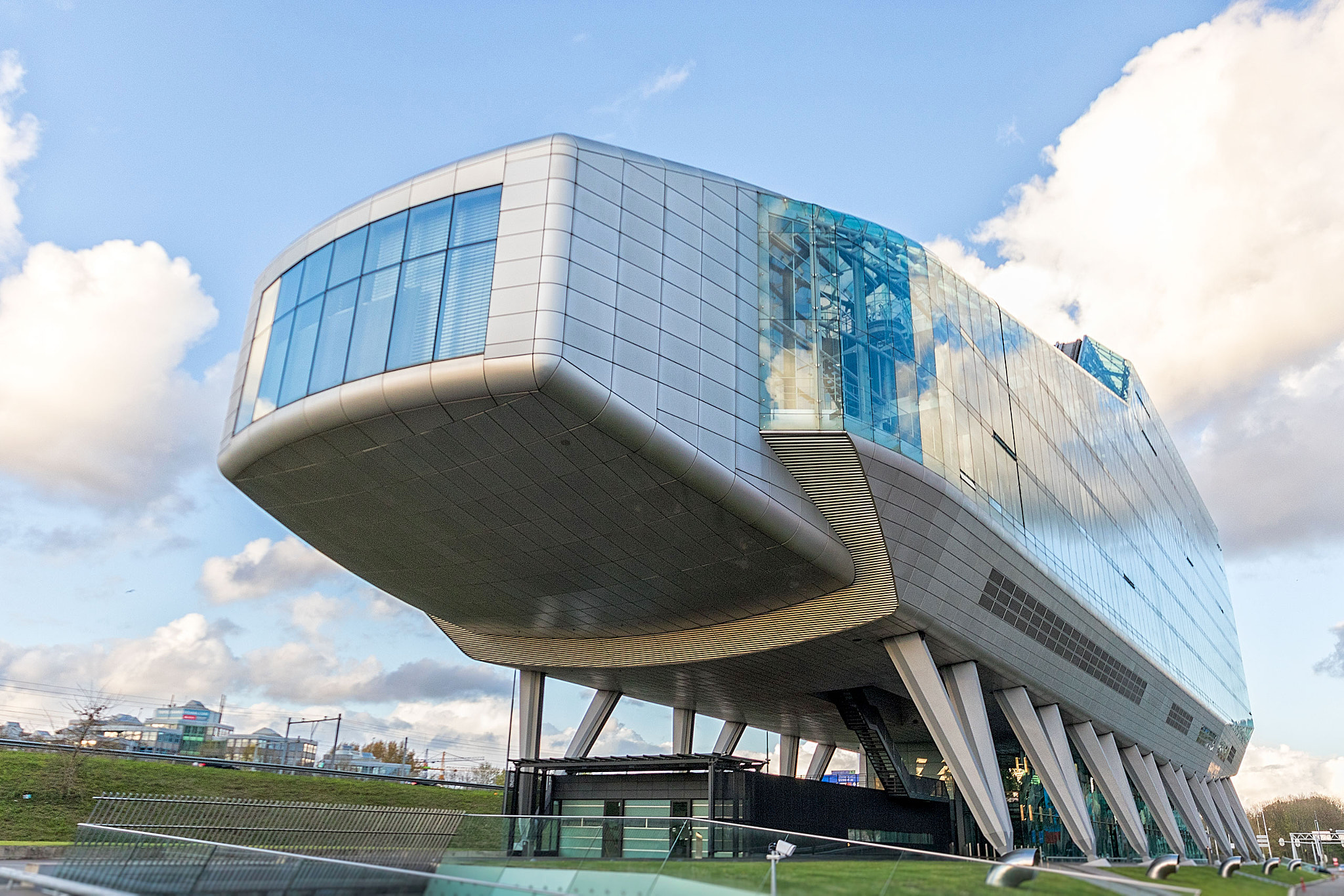
The former ING House, nicknamed The Shoe

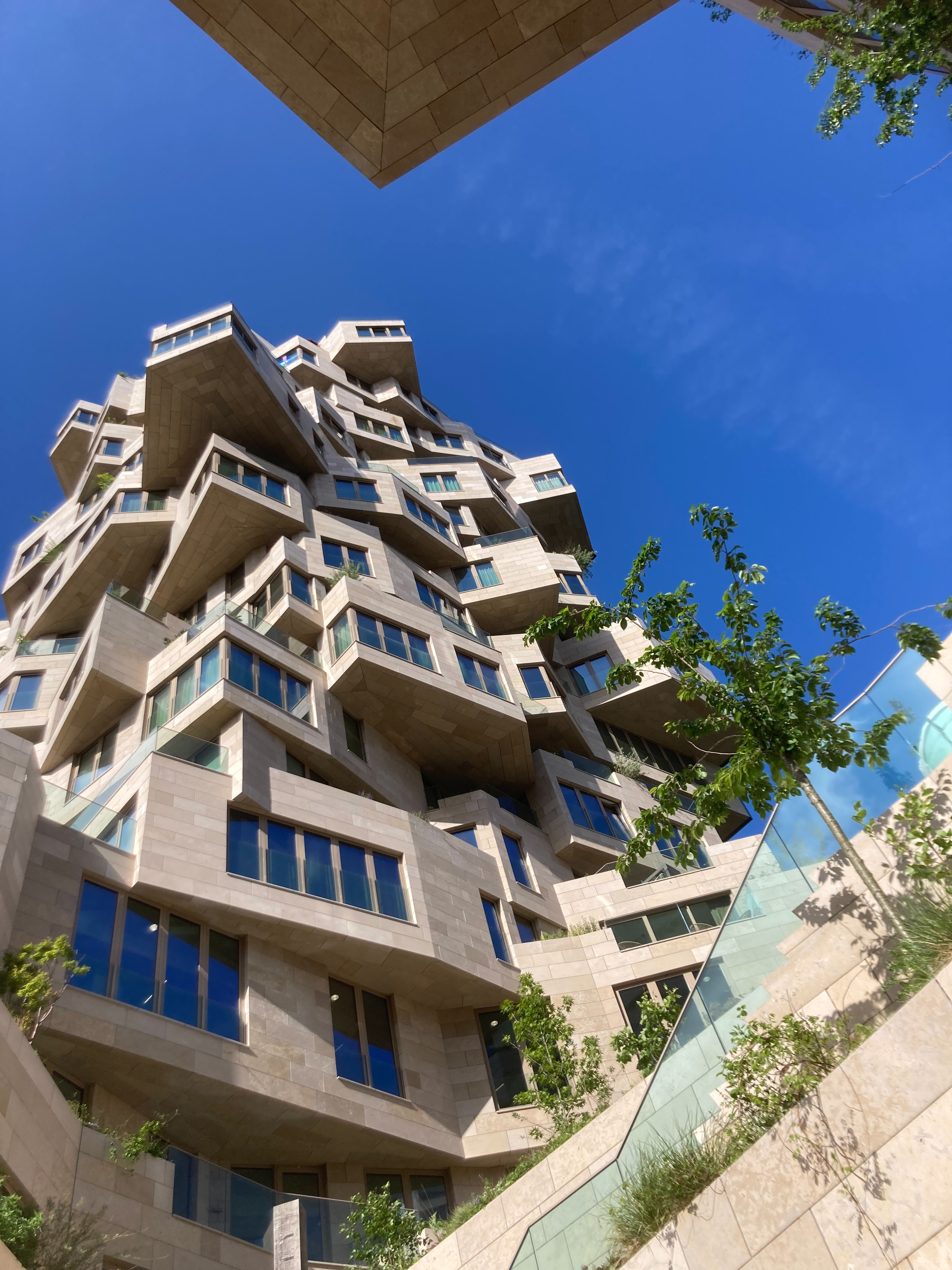
Valley mixed-use complex

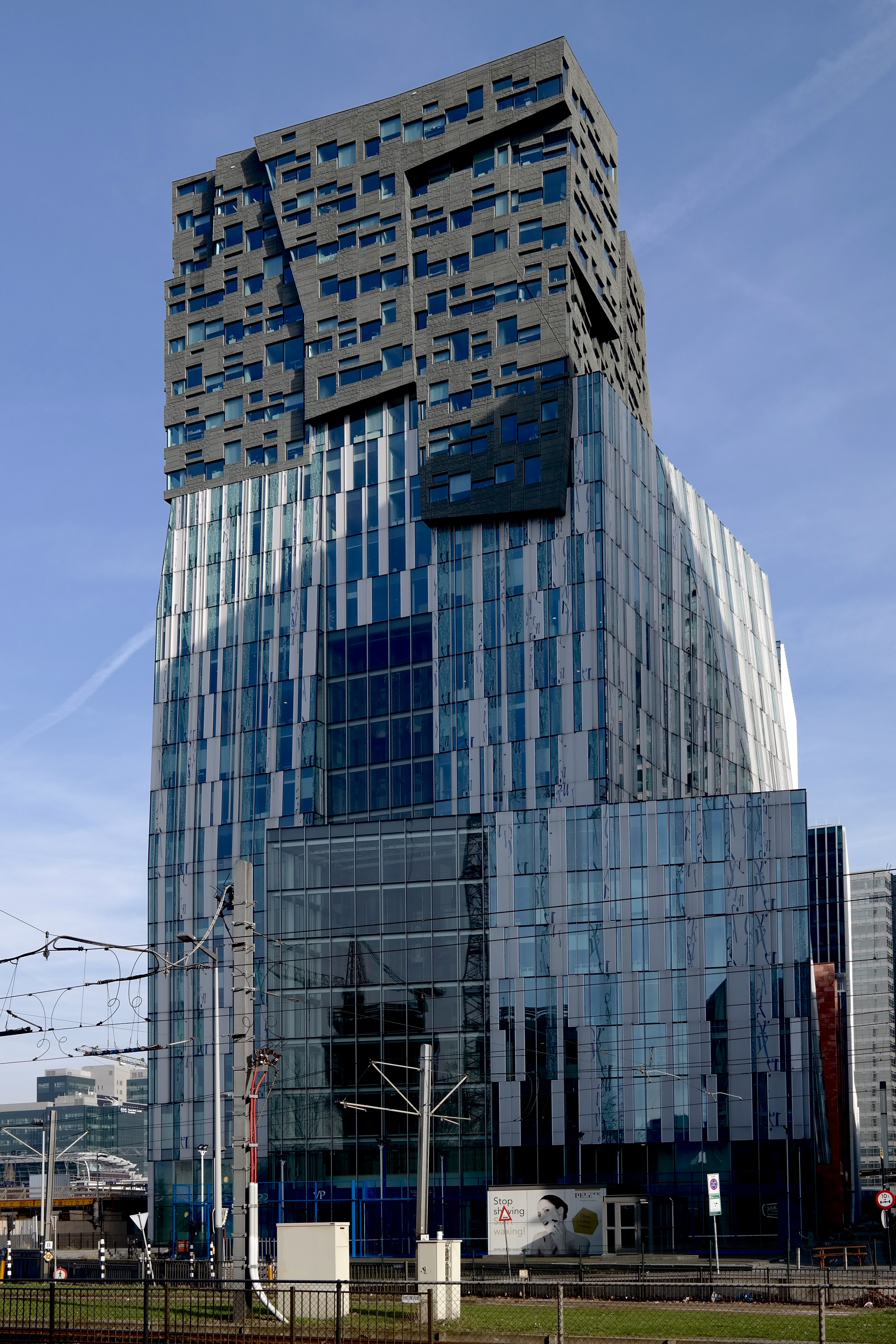
The Rock

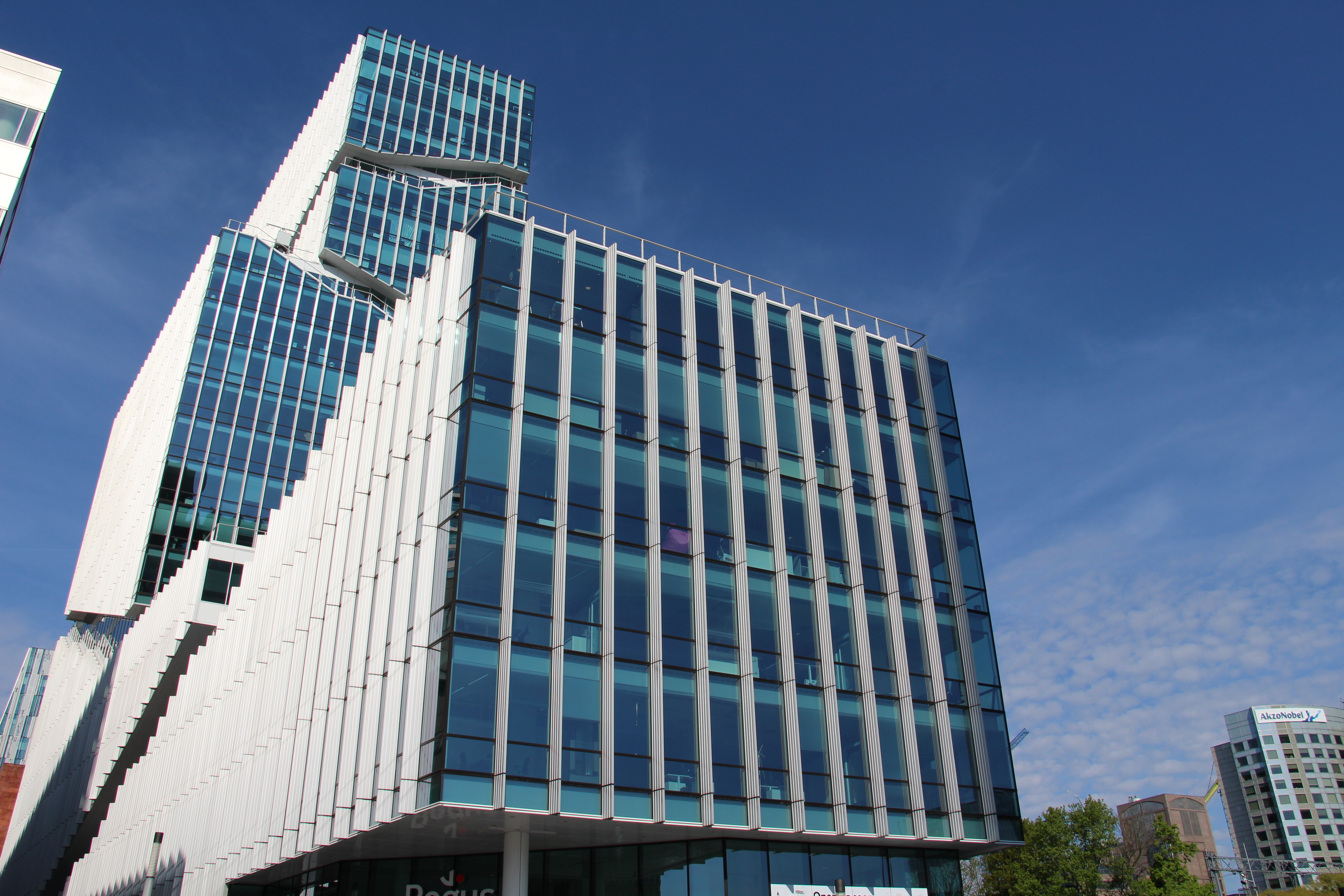
Viñoly Tower

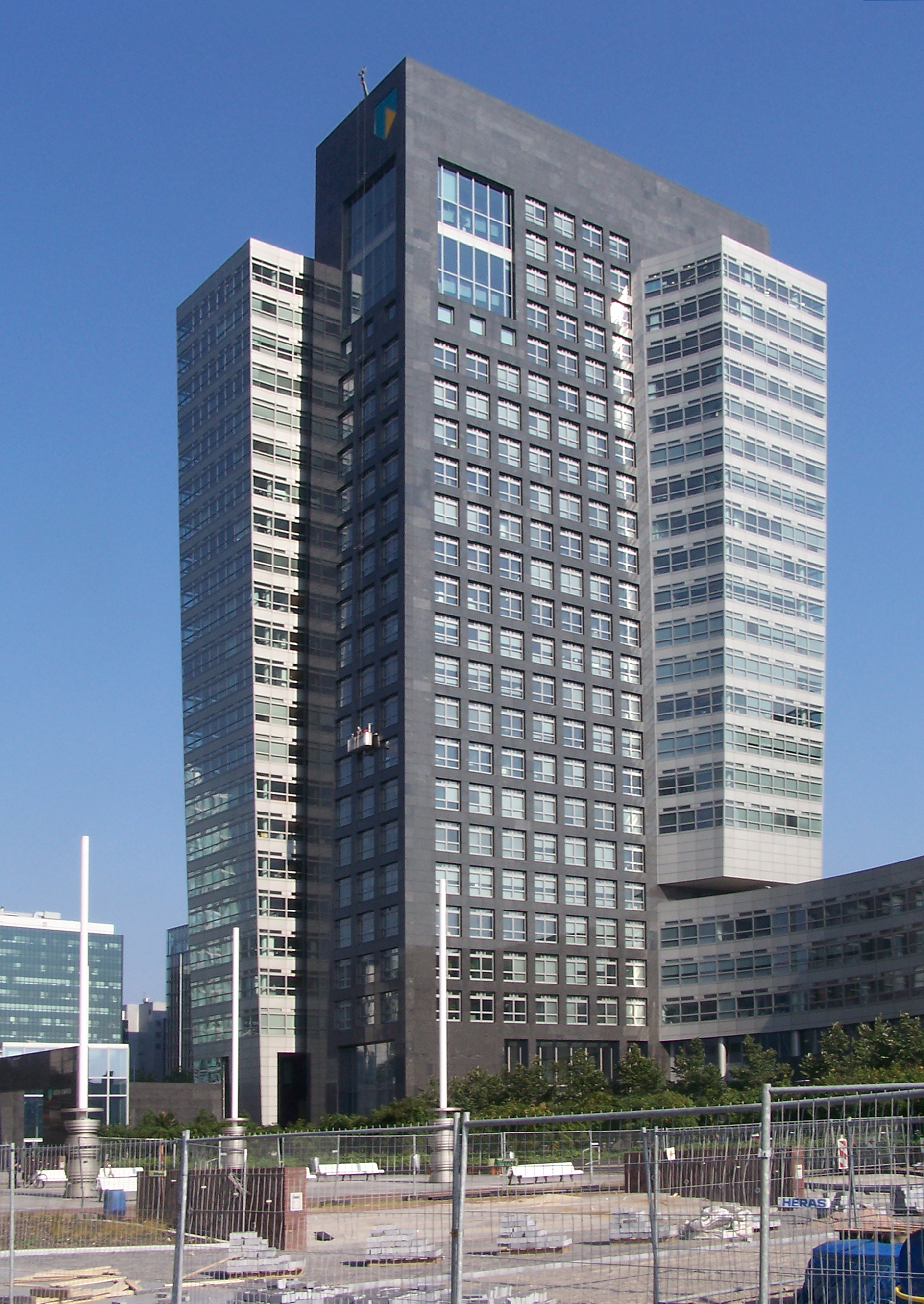
Former ABN AMRO headquarters

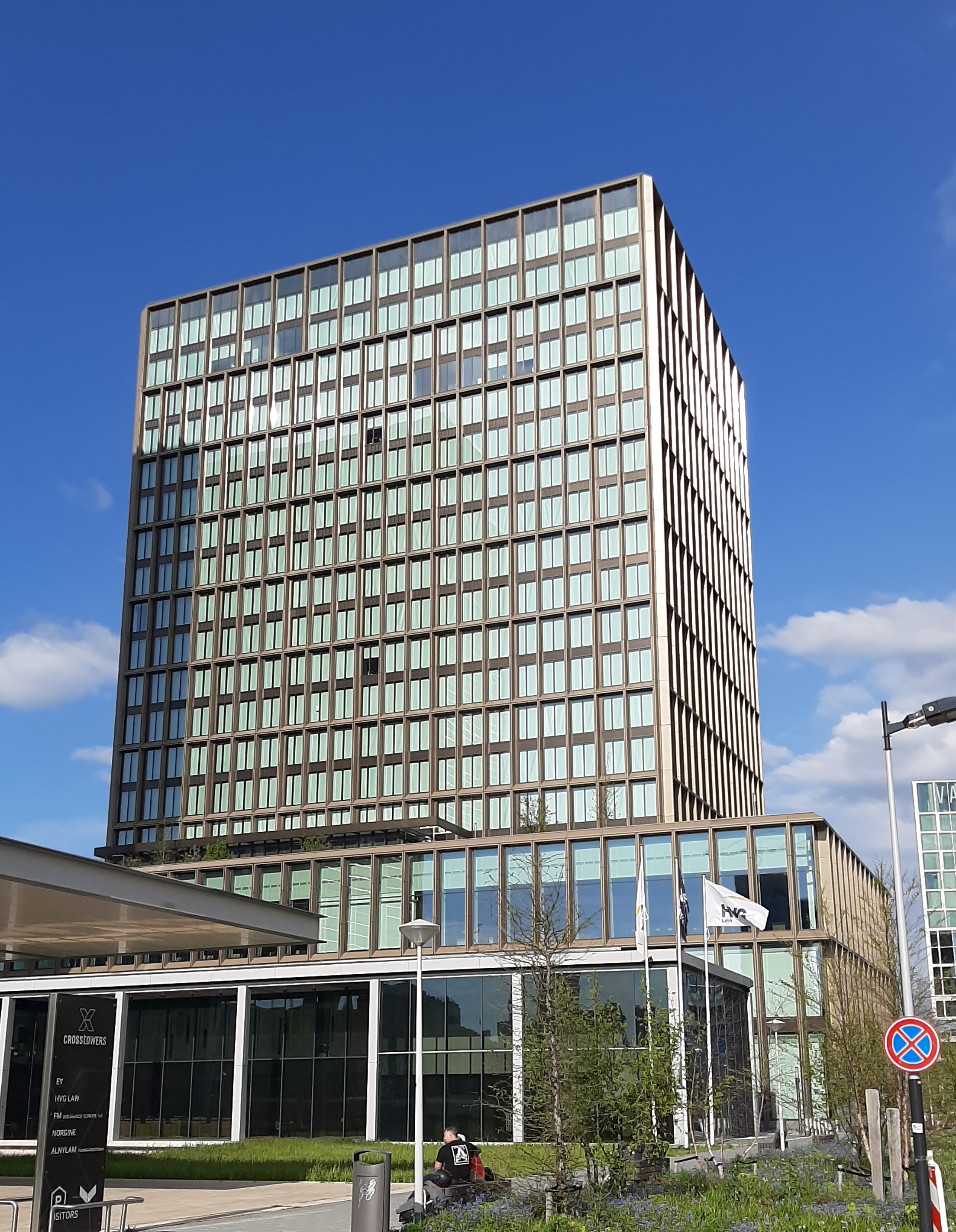
Vivaldi building, housing the European Medicines Agency

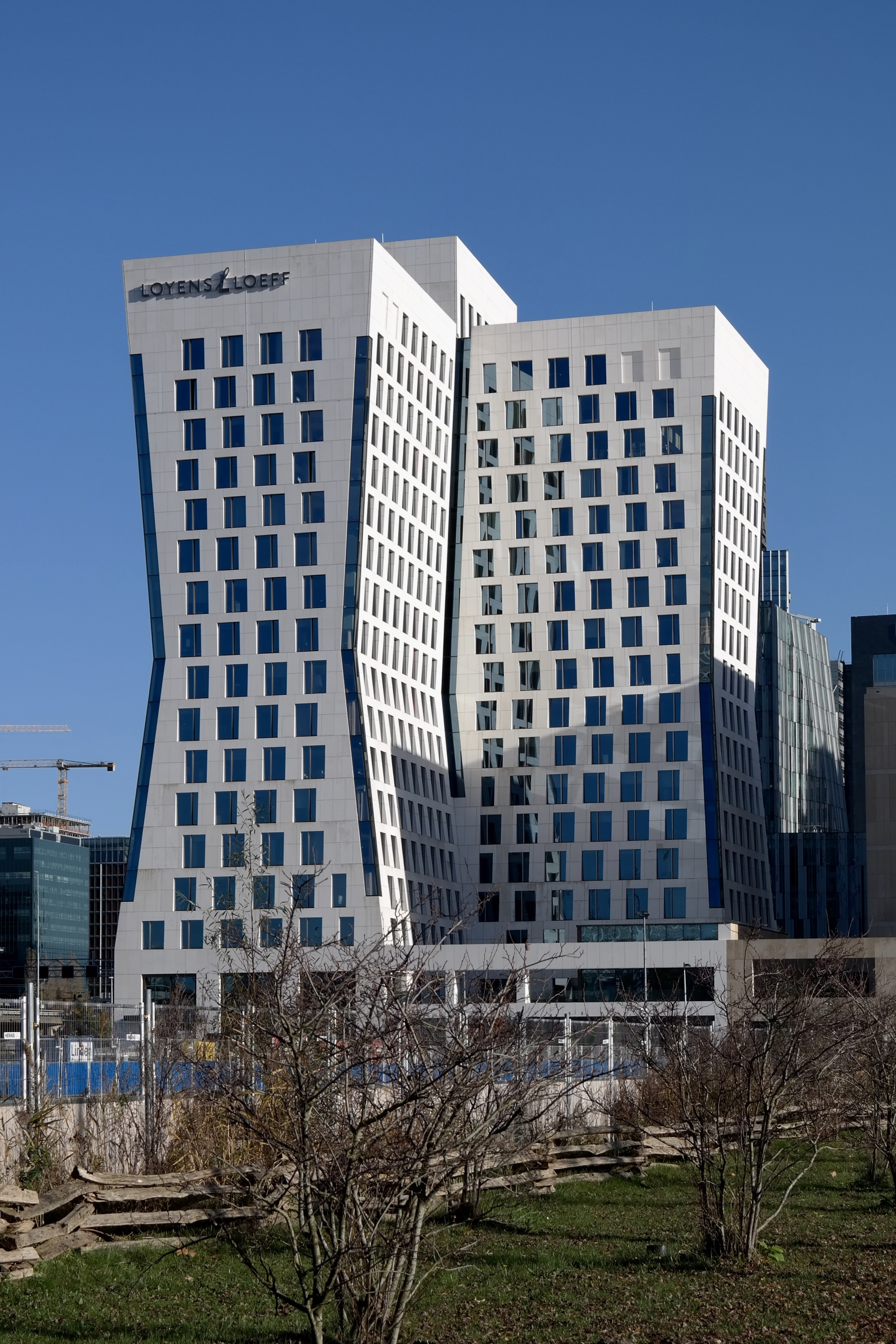
Hourglass building

== See also ==
- Economy of Amsterdam
- Zuidasdok
