= Middlesbrough Institute of Modern Art =

Coordinates: 54.5745°N 1.2327°W

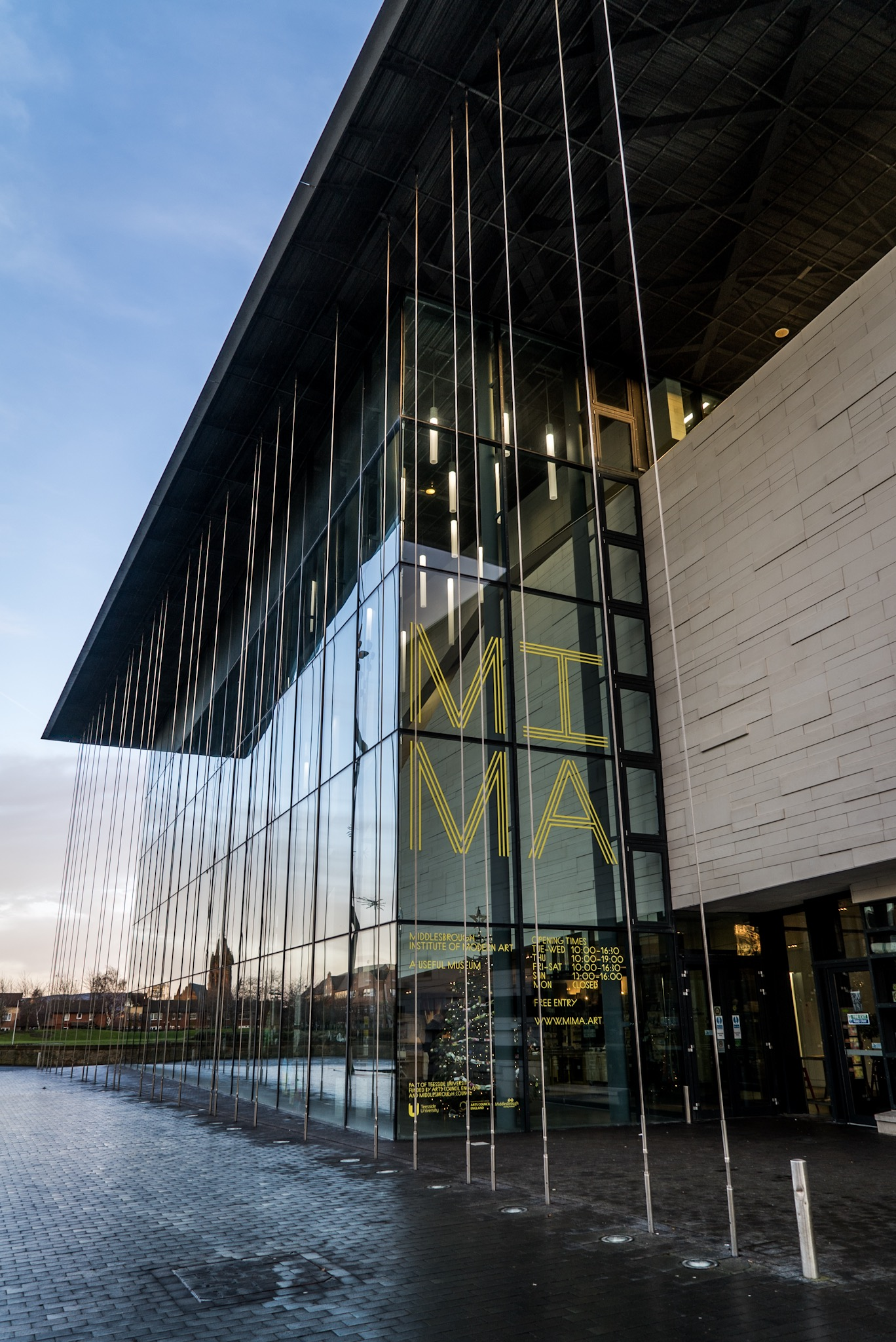
- Established: 27 January 2007
- Location: Centre Square, Middlesbrough, England
- Type: Art Museum
- Director: Laura Sillars
- Website: mima.art

MIMA, or Middlesbrough Institute of Modern Art, is a contemporary art gallery based in the centre of Middlesbrough, England. The gallery was formally launched on Sunday, 27 January 2007; since 2014, it has been part of Teesside University.

== History and estates ==
The gallery's opening marked the completion of an accumulative journey for the art collection of post-industrial Middlesbrough. The early artistic heritage of a town as young as Middlesbrough rested largely on the success of the Linthorpe Art Pottery (1879–1889), co-launched by Christopher Dresser, out of the Sun Brickworks that also built the suburb of Linthorpe. A School of Art opened alongside the Mechanics' Institute in the old town's Durham Street, in 1870, and by the 1950s that, too, had relocated to Linthorpe. The region's cultural profile was further boosted by the Cleveland International Drawing Biennale, until that competition's extinction in the 1990s.

A site for the town's first art gallery was granted by the father of the Mayor, Sir Arthur Dorman, in 1904. This was on Linthorpe Road opposite, and conceived in the same spate of events as what was to become the Dorman Museum outside Albert Park. Funding shortfalls amid the onset of war, however, ensured that only a rest garden was eventually sited there. In the meantime, from 1927, the Carnegie library and Grange Road Methodist Church housed the collection of paintings. No permanent provision for the pieces materialised until 1957, with the purchase by the Council of a former doctor's surgery on Linthorpe Road. It was not until 2003 that this building was vacated.

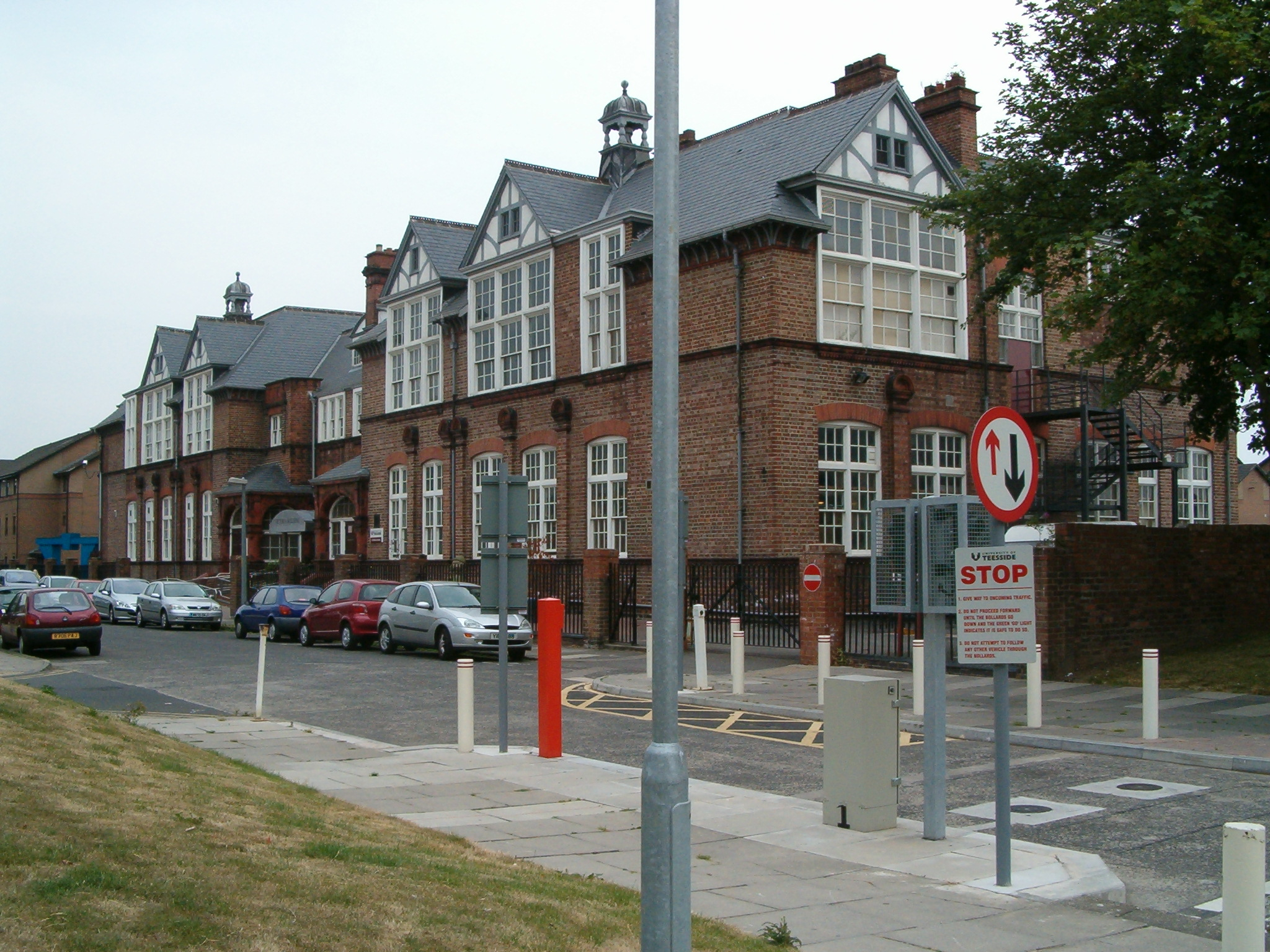
Cleveland Gallery

The former Cleveland Crafts Centre, on Gilkes Street, catered for a collection of twentieth-century British studio ceramics and artist-made jewellery dating from the 1970s onwards. The Cleveland Crafts Centre was closed as an exhibition venue in January 2003, and thereafter operated as the mima offices whilst the new gallery was being constructed. Its sister institution that lasted until 1999, the Cleveland Gallery, resided nearby in the unused school buildings on Victoria Road. They are today home to the University of Teesside's graduate incubation studios in aid of new business start-ups.

Following the closure in January 2003 of the two surviving galleries, construction of the present accommodation comprising the gallery spaces, education suite, auditorium, café-bar, shop, roof terrace, collection stores and conservation studio commenced in 2004. The centre was designed by Erick van Egeraat Associated Architect. Whilst construction was underway, mima programmed a series of offsite exhibitions and events including such artists as John Harrison and Paul Wood, Susan Pietzsch, Yuka Oyama, Graham Dolphin, Chicks on Speed, Martin Creed, Oliver Zwink and Mah Rana.

MIMA's founding director was Godfrey Worsdale, who left in 2008 to become director of the Baltic Centre for Contemporary Art. He was succeeded by Kate Brindley, previously director of Museums and Galleries at Bristol City Council She was briefly succeeded by Mark Robinson, who was acting director during the transition of ownership between the local authority and the university, and managed the recruitment of Alistair Hudson, previously Deputy Director at Grizedale Arts, who took on the role in 2014 and left in 2017 to become Director of the Manchester Art Gallery and the Whitworth. The current director is Laura Sillars, who joined from Sheffield's Site Gallery.

MIMA has participated in the Tate's programme Artist Rooms, featuring exhibitions by Gerhard Richter, Jannis Kounellis and Louise Bourgeois.

On 21 and 22 November 2009, the cast of the BBC motoring programme Top Gear – Jeremy Clarkson, Richard Hammond and James May – held an exhibition of automotive art at MIMA, which featured in the 5th episode of the 14th series of the show, setting an all-time record for the gallery.

== Middlesbrough Collection ==
MIMA's Middlesbrough Collection comprises outstanding fine and applied art from 19th century to the present day, with many pieces acquired by mima's forerunners, Middlesbrough Art Gallery and the Cleveland Craft Centre.

Works include; Frank Auerbach, Elizabeth Blackadder, David Bomberg, Ken Currie, Jeremy Deller, Tracey Emin, Sir Jacob Epstein, Dame Elisabeth Frink, James Walter Gozzard, David Hockney, Peter Howson, Gwen John, Panayiotis Kalorkoti, L.S. Lowry, Ben Nicholson, Eduardo Paolozzi, Adrian Piper, Katherine Pleydell-Bouverie, Anne Redpath, Paula Rego, David Remfry, Lucie Rie, Stanley Spencer, Nancy Spero and Kara Walker.

In 2015, Tees Valley Arts donated a collection of significant artworks to the gallery as the Tees Valley Arts Collection, including works by artists Vivan Sundaram, Len Tabner and Adrian Wiszniewski.

== See also ==
- Vleeshal Middelburg
