= Ito-toren =

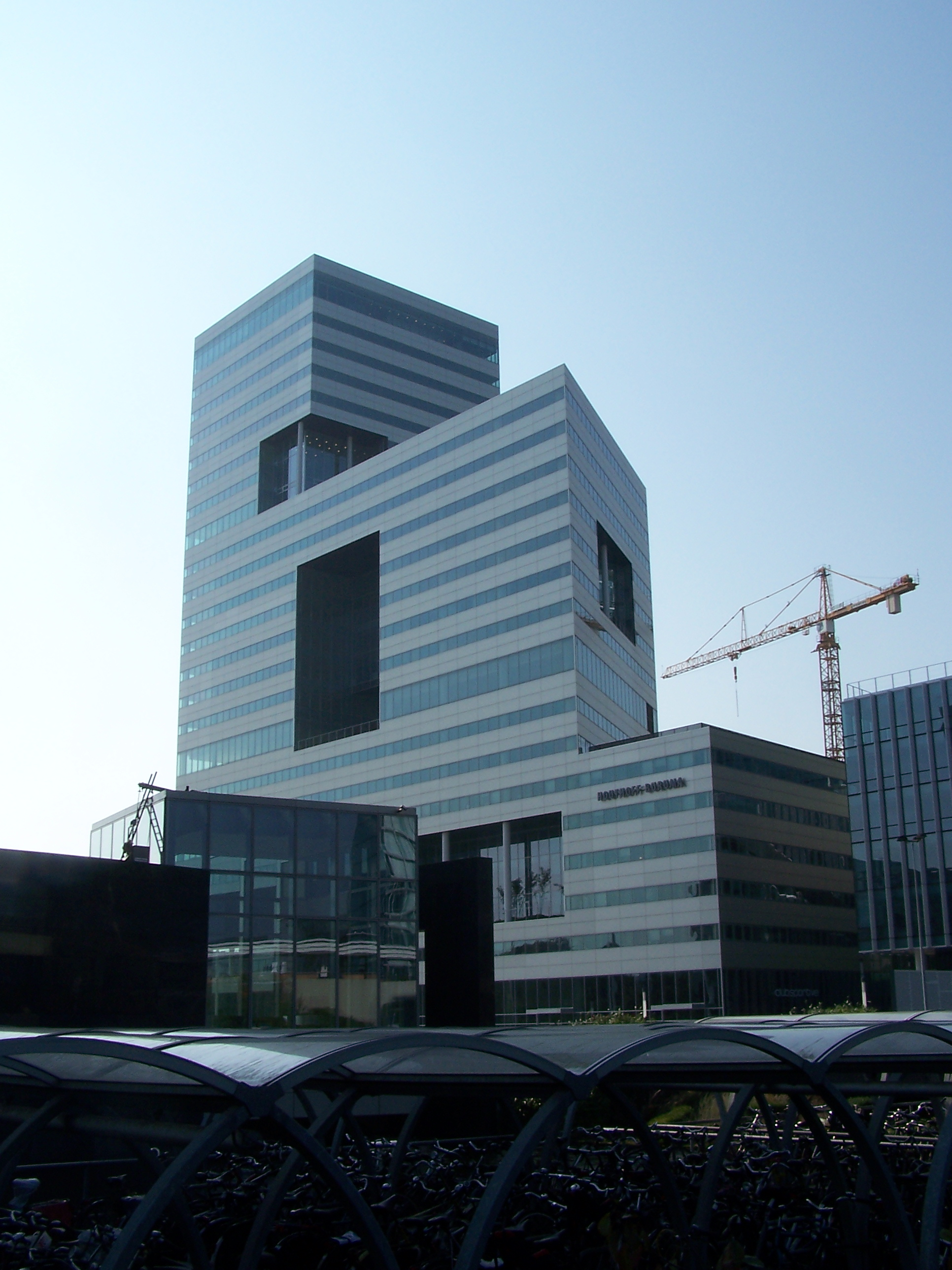
- The Ito-toren in 2005

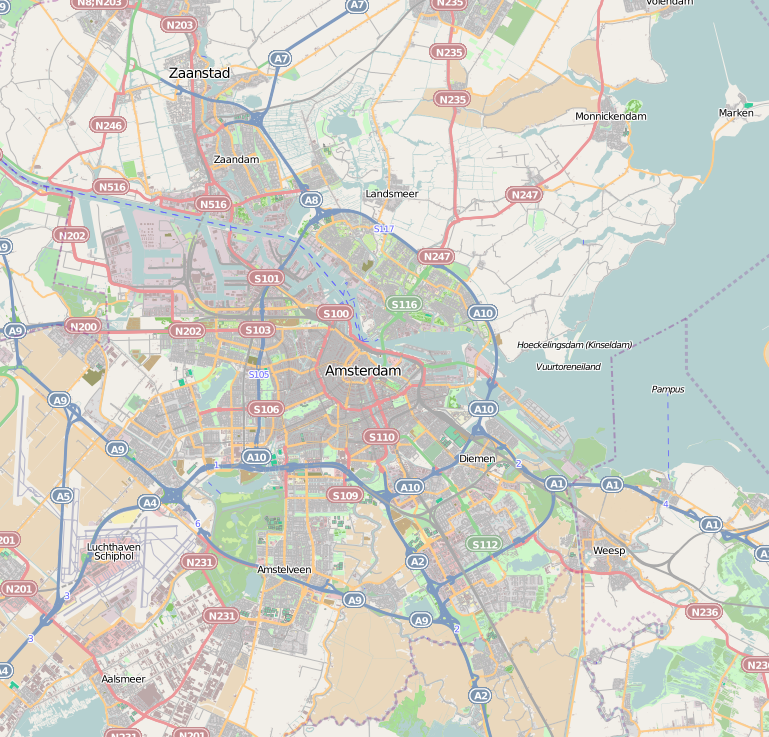
- Location within the metropolitan of Amsterdam

General information
- Status: In use
- Type: Offices
- Location: Amsterdam
- Coordinates: 52°20′14″N 4°52′22″E
- Construction started: September 2002
- Opened: June 2005
- Owner: G&S Vastgoed (2002); Commerz Real (2002-2014); Union Investment (since 2014)

Height
- Height: 100 m (328 ft)

Technical details
- Floor count: 25 (two underground floors excluded)
- Floor area: 34,551 m^{2} (371,904 sq ft)

Design and construction
- Architecture firm: Toyo Ito & Associates

The Ito-toren (Dutch for Ito Tower) is a 100 metres (328 feet) tall office building in the Zuidas in the Dutch capital city Amsterdam. The building is part of the Mahler4 complex and has inside that complex the code "1AH".

== Construction and ownership ==
The construction of the Ito-toren was part of the first construction phase of Mahler4 and took place between September 2002 and June 2005. In June 2004, the building was topped out. The developers of the Ito-toren were G&S Vastgoed, Fortis Vastgoed Ontwikkeling and ING Real Estate. Toyo Ito, after whom the building is named, and his architecture firm designed the office building. ZZDP Architecten was involved in the design process as well. The company Van der Vorm was the engineer.

In December 2002, the developer G&S Vastgoed sold the building for €133.5 million to the German company Commerz Grundbesitz-Investmentgesellschaft (CGI), a Commerz Real company. At the same time, CGI bought the office building SOM and the parking garage, both parts of Mahler4 as well. CGI was together with the three developers involved as an investor in the project since 1999. Commerz Real was negotiating with Tishman Speyer in order to sell the Ito-toren at the end of 2013, but the companies didn't reach an agreement. The German company Union Investment did reach an agreement on April 15, 2014 and thus bought the Ito-toren for €172.8 million, which was €200,000 more than the estimated value by an appraiser. The nearby office building SOM was again sold at the same time.

== Architecture ==
The Ito-toren has twenty-five above ground floors and two underground floors. The footprint of the building has a size of around 2,600 m^{2} (27,986 sq ft). The supporting elements of the Ito-toren are made of reinforced concrete and the building has a steel frame. The Ito-toren has an angular exterior with holes in it. The facade is characterized by horizontal rows of windows with rows of aluminium panels in between them. Inside the Ito-toren, there are four atria.

The Ito-toren has a total floor area of 34,551 m^{2} (371,904 sq ft). On the ground level, there's a cafeteria for the people working in the building. Besides, the Ito-toren has a large rooftop terrace on the 16th floor. The biggest tenant is the law firm Houthoff, that extended its lease agreement by ten years in November 2013. The law firm rents a total floor surface of 12,500 m^{2} (134,549 sq ft). Other tenants include ABN AMRO, Accenture, BearingPoint, Edelman and Trafigura. The Icelandic commercial bank Icesave had its office in the Ito-toren as well.

== Gallery ==
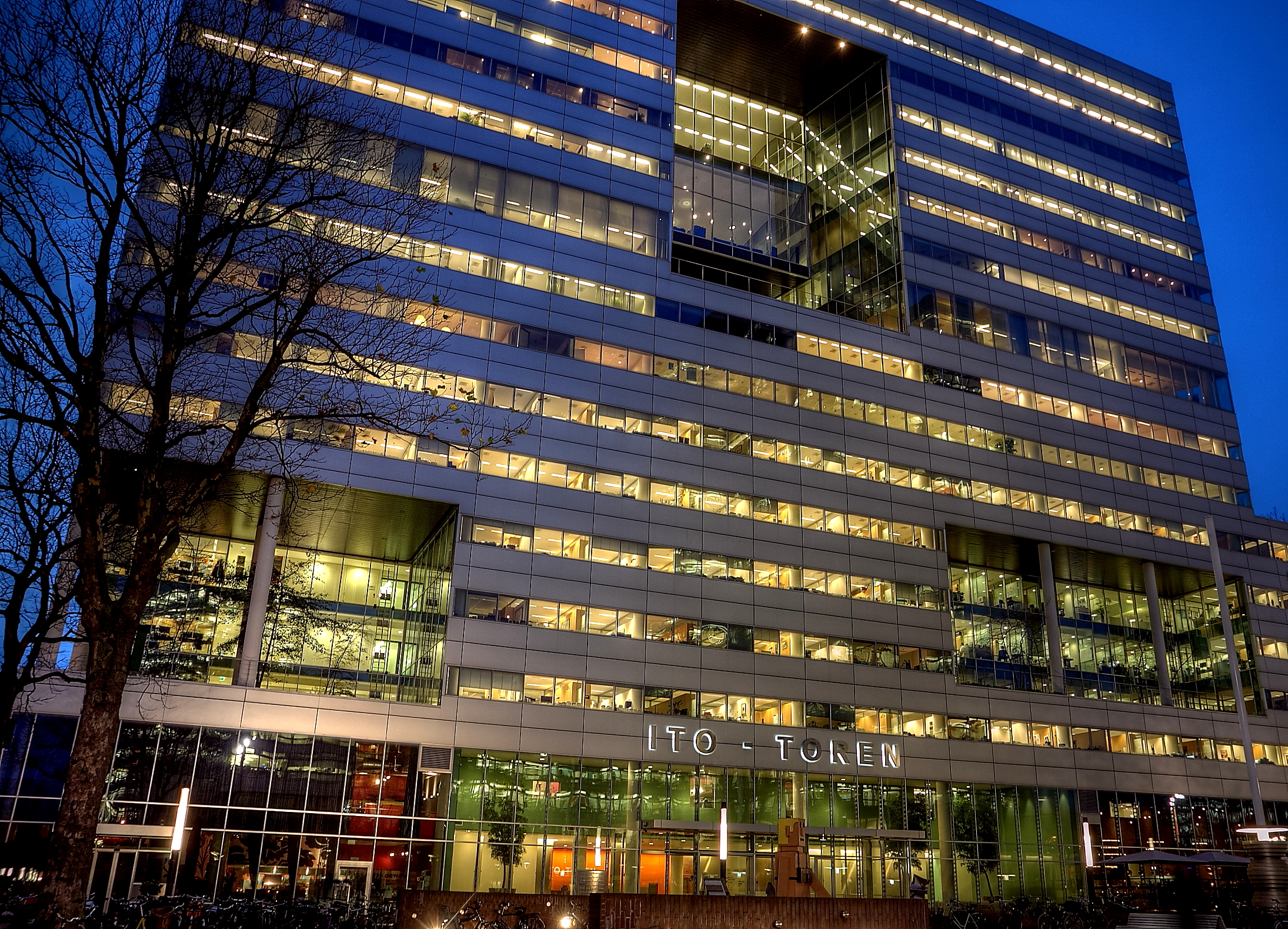
The Ito-toren in 2011

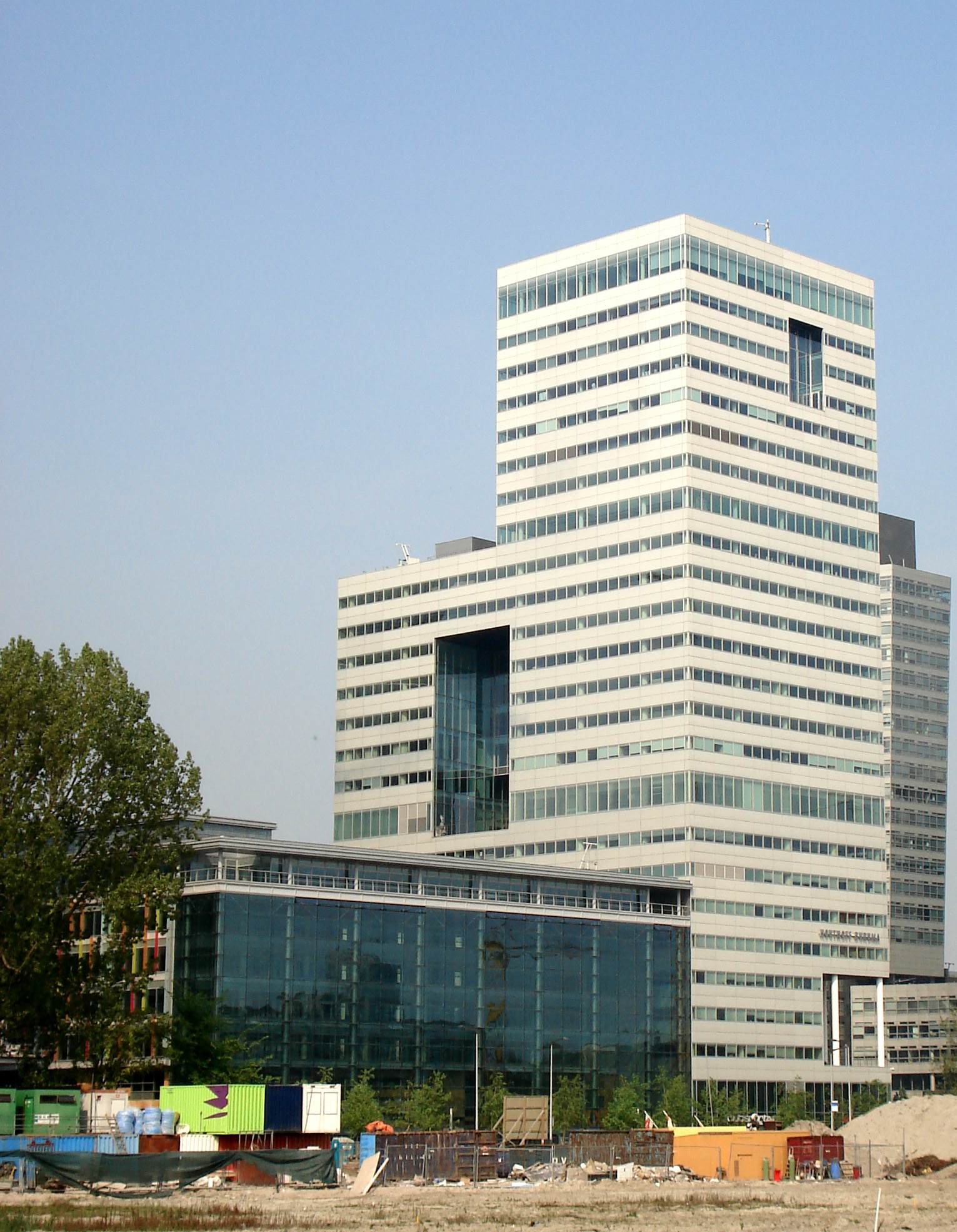
The office building in 2007
