= Federation Island =

Planned island near Sochi, Russia

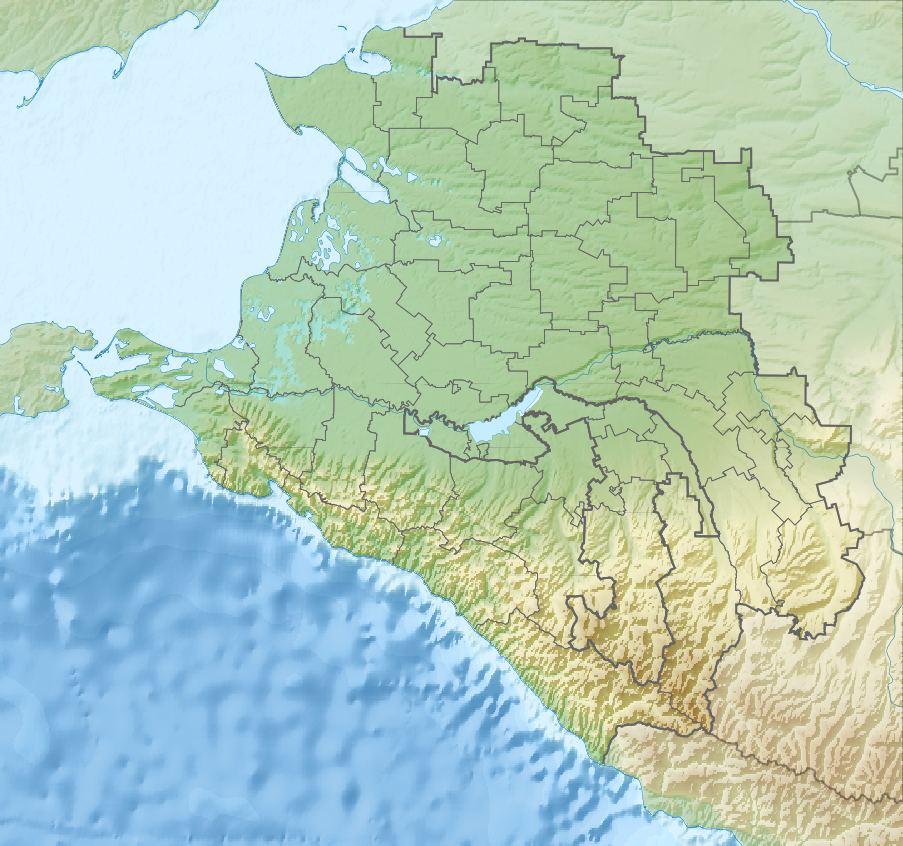
- Location within Krasnodar Krai Location within European Russia

Geography
- Location: Krasnodar Krai, Russia
- Coordinates: 43°36′15″N 39°41′45″E
- Adjacent to: Black Sea

Administration
- Russia

Federation Island (Russian: Остров "Федерация") is an artificial island archipelago that was projected to be located off the coast of Sochi, Russia, in the Black Sea.

== History ==
The archipelago complex plans were designed by Erick van Egeraat. The island would have been built in the shape of Russia. It would have contained residences, hotels, cultural, leisure and recreational facilities. The $6.2 billion project was announced at the International Investment Forum 2007 and was approved by president Vladimir Putin. The project would have been developed by M-Industries of St. Petersburg in co-operation with Dutch engineering companies Witteveen & Bos and Van Oord.

The project was frozen in 2012.
