= ING House =

Coordinates: 52.337071°N 4.854010°E

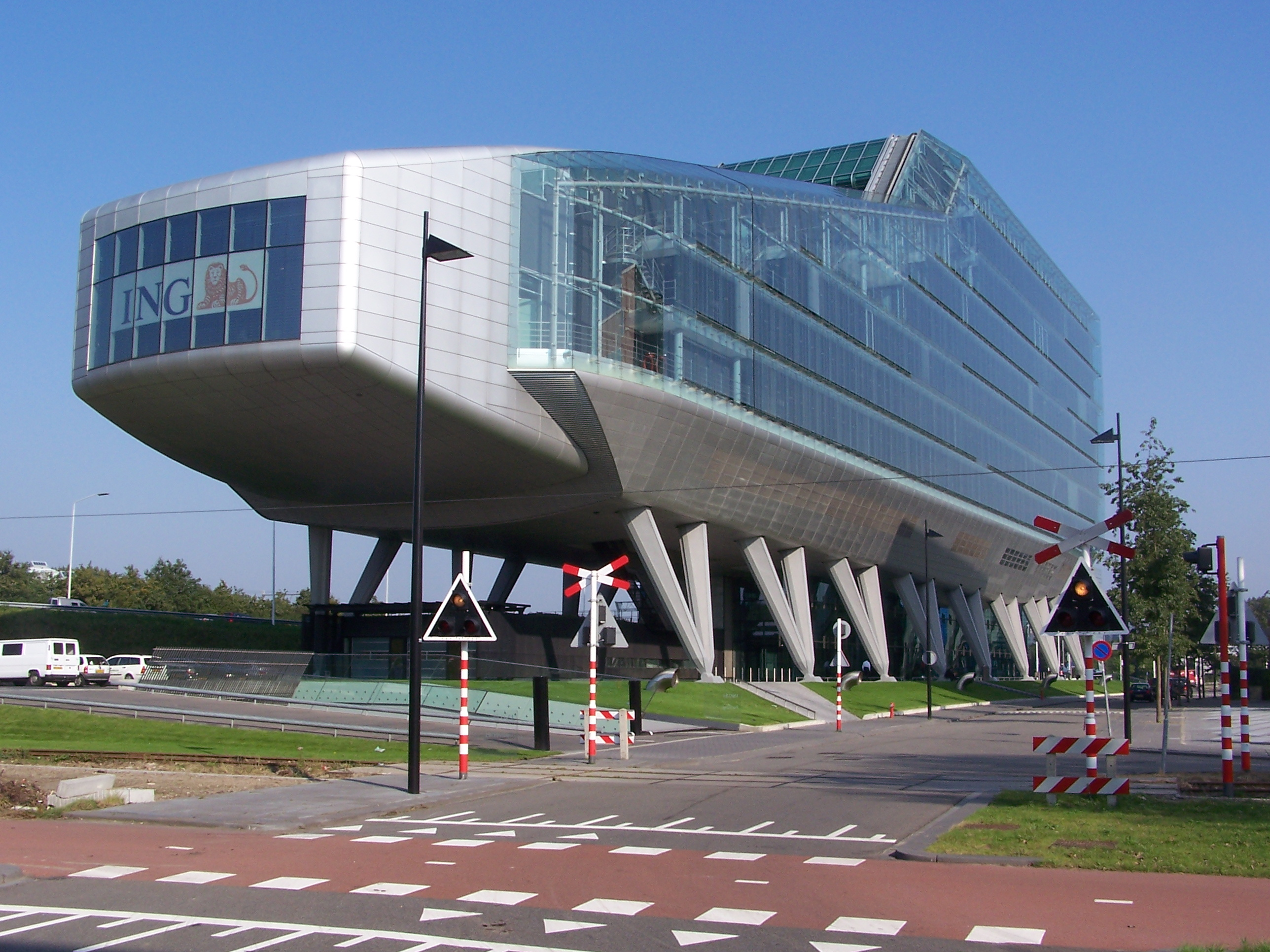

General information
- Groundbreaking: 16 November 1999
- Inaugurated: 16 September 2002
- Height: 48m

Technical details
- Floor count: 10
- Floor area: 20,000m^{2}

Design and construction
- Architecture firm: Meyer & Van Schooten Architecten
- Structural engineer: Arup, Aronsohn
- Services engineer: RTB Van Heugten
- Main contractor: Heijmans

Other information
- Parking: 160 underground spaces

ING House is the former headquarters of ING Group at the business district Zuidas of Amsterdam, the Netherlands. It is nicknamed "de schoen" (Dutch for the shoe) or "de kruimeldief" (Dutch for hand held vacuum cleaner). The postmodern design is by Amsterdam-based architects Meyer and Van Schooten (Meyer en Van Schooten). The construction, which took place from November 1999 to September 2002, was undertaken by Heijmans.

The building is constructed like a table on 16 angled steel legs. These are independent of each other, resting on pins in large concrete blocks in the ground, a technique also found in bridge construction. On this platform the floors are built. The belly of the building on the second floor is actually at the height of the highway, as the ground is lower than the highway. From the third floor one has a view of the highway.

In 2012, the headquarters of ING Group moved to the Bijlmermeer. In 2014, ING subsidiary Nationale-Nederlanden also moved from the building. Since then, the building has been used as a multi-tenant office building under the name "Infinity".
