= Erick van Egeraat =

Dutch architect and author (born 1956)

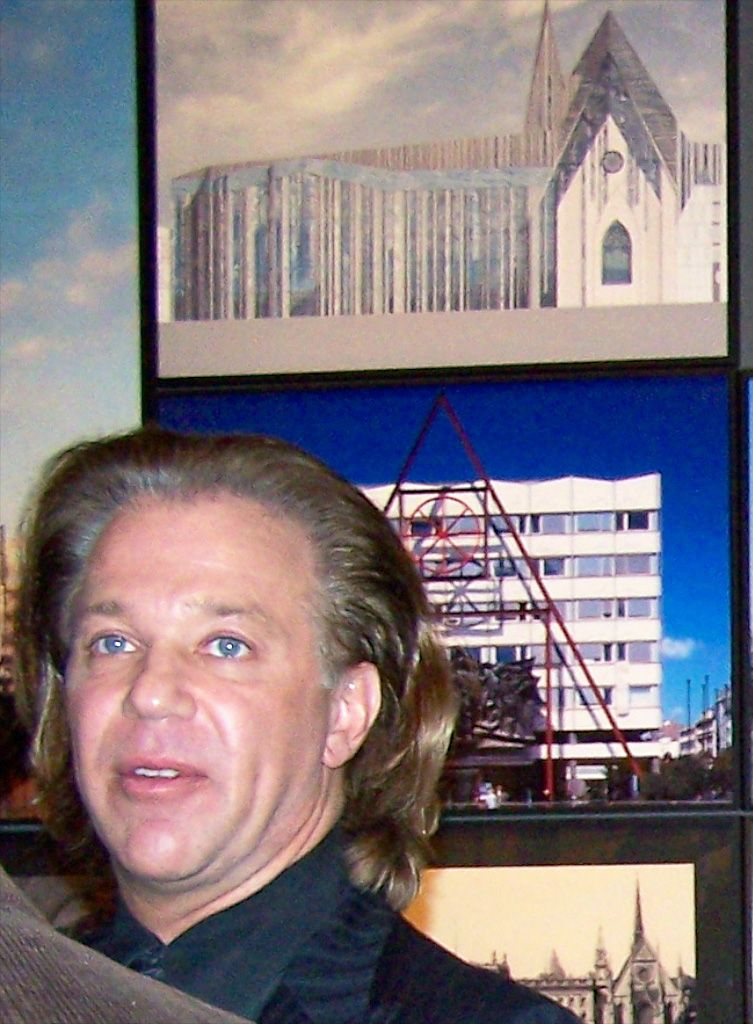
- Erick van Egeraat in 2007
- Born: 27 April 1956 (age 70); Amsterdam, Netherlands
- Education: Delft University of Technology
- Occupation: Architect
- Awards: Media Architecture Award (2014); RIBA Award (2007); European Property award (2013)
- Practice: (designed by) Erick van Egeraat
- Buildings: ING Head Office in Budapest; Drents Museum in Assen; The Rock tower in Amsterdam; Incineration line in Roskilde; Main building and Auditorium, Leipzig University; Corporate University of Sberbank in Moscow

Erick van Egeraat (Dutch pronunciation: [ˈeːrɪk fɑn ˈeːɣəraːt]; (Note: In isolation, van is pronounced [vɑn].) born 1956) is a Dutch architect and author. He heads the architectural practice Erick van Egeraat Associated Architects (EEA), based in Rotterdam with offices in Moscow, Budapest and Prague. He is best known for his projects of ING Group Headquarters in Budapest, Drents Museum in Assen, The Rock tower in Amsterdam, Incineration line in Roskilde, Main building and Auditorium in Leipzig University and the Corporate University of Sberbank in Moscow. He is the winner of RIBA Award 2007, Best Building Award 2011&2012 and European Property Award 2013.

April 26, 2016, Erick van Egeraat was decorated ‘Officer in the order of Oranje Nassau.' This decoration was presented to Erick van Egeraat by the Mayor of Rotterdam, on behalf of the King of the Netherlands.

== Early career ==
Erick van Egeraat graduated from the Delft University of Technology, Department of Architecture. During his last year in the university, after winning the competition to design flexible youth housing at Kruisplein, Rotterdam he co-founded Mecanoo with Henk Döll, Francine Houben, Roelf Steenhuis and Chris de Weijer. The early years of Mecanoo were characterized by projects which challenged the norms of urban renewal and social housing. Notable projects include Housing Kruisplein, Rotterdam (1980-1985), Bilderberg Parkhotel, Rotterdam (1990-1992), House 13 at the IGA Stuttgart 1993 (1990-1993), Faculty of Economics and Management, Utrecht (1991-1995) and the Library at Delft University of Technology (1992-1998).

== Later career ==
In 1995 Erick van Egeraat left Mecanoo and established his own company Erick van Egeraat Associated Architects (EEA) with offices in Rotterdam, London, Budapest, Prague and Moscow. A milestone project which expressed his new architectural approach was the Headquarters of ING Bank and NNH Insurance company in Budapest (1992-1994). In his own words, “It may be considered one of the first buildings to juxtapose an uncompromising modernism with intuitive organic shapes to achieve what might be called Modern Baroque”. The new vision found its articulation in a variety of projects, such as Crawford Art Gallery in Cork, Ireland (1996–2000), Pop-stage Mezz in Breda, the Netherlands (1996–2002), Mauritskade building in Amsterdam, the Netherlands (1996–2002), City Hall in Alphen aan den Rijn, the Netherlands (1997–2002) and Visual Art Center in Middlesbrough, England (2007) for which the architect received the RIBA award.

This period was marked by a greater diversity of work, from product design (door handle Erick, 2008) to master-planning (Oosterdokseiland in Amsterdam, The Netherlands, (1998–2001) and increasing focus on Central and Eastern Europe where he built the Royal Netherlands Embassy in Warsaw, Poland (1999–2004), ING Group Headquarters in Budapest, Hungary (1999–2004), Hotel Kempinski in Bratislava, Slovakia (2004–2008) and other projects. Erick van Egeraat was particularly interested to work in historical context, as shown in his projects of Liget Center (2000–2002) and Deak Palace (2003–2004) in Budapest, Hungary as well as master-plan of New Holland Island in Saint Petersburg, Russia (competition 2006). Working with historical buildings or in historical ambience, he aimed for “continuity and memory rather than rupture and rejection”.

In 2000s Erick van Egeraat started to work actively in Russia. The thrill of work in a new architectural environment made him design his "most spectacular, pure architecture project" Russian Avant-Garde in Moscow (2001) which made him "one of the most flamboyant architects in the Netherlands", according to the critics. Russian Avant-Garde and Federation Island in Sochi (2007) caused a stir and started a public discourse, but did not reach the stage of realization. The others were successfully built, among them: Capital City in Moscow (2002–2010) and Trade and Entertainment Center Vershina in Surgut (2005–2010).

In 2009 Erick van Egeraat restructured his company into (designed by) Erick van Egeraat with offices in Rotterdam, Moscow, Budapest and Prague. Despite the Great Recession, his focus on complexity and quality steadily grew. In Europe he completed the projects of Drents Museum in Assen, the Netherlands (2008–2011), Incineration Line in Roskilde, Denmark (2008–2013), Main building and Auditorium in Leipzig University, Germany (2004–2015) and Erasmus University College in Rotterdam, the Netherlands (2012–2014). In Russia he built Chess Academy in Khanty-Mansiysk (2008–2010), Corporate University of Sberbank in Moscow region (2010–2013) and completed Mercury City Tower in Moscow (2011–2013). His interest in working in historical context is manifest in his high-profile design of the new Dynamo stadium (winner of the competition, 2010) and master-planning, design and consultancy works for development of the territory of the former Red October chocolate factory (since 2007).

Portfolio of Erick van Egeraat includes over 100 projects in more than 10 countries, including the Saudi Arabia where he created the master-plan for the city center of Unaizah (2014).

== Writings and design philosophy ==
Erick van Egeraat authored several books. In Six Ideas about Architecture written in collaboration with Deyan Sudjic he takes us to the world of a person who, just like the hero of The Fountainhead “loves this earth, but doesn’t like the shape of things on this earth and wants to change them.” His definition of sustainable architecture marries beauty with quality: "We need to reintroduce architecture which once again captivates us. Beauty, strength and a focus on qualitative materials are essential elements from which a truly sustainable architecture can emerge.

His later book 10 years Erick van Egeraat: Realized Works co-authored by Philip Jodidio, presents a comprehensive sweep of his oeuvre of the period 1995-2005, from the first post-Mecanoo years when he was trying to make a difference convinced that the future proof architecture needs to show "more than bare essentials". to the full architectural maturity, both loyal to long-established standards of beauty and decidedly contemporary: “I believe that all architecture of historic significance was modern at the time it was built, emerging from its time and culture.”

His most recent book Life without Beauty elaborates on importance of beauty in architecture which in the 20th century lost a battle to budget: “In Holland, the budget was the only subject. Many architects didn’t like the word “beauty”. He claims that ultimate measure for society or human being is not ability to make money, but its achievements and the beauty it has produced.

== Selected projects ==
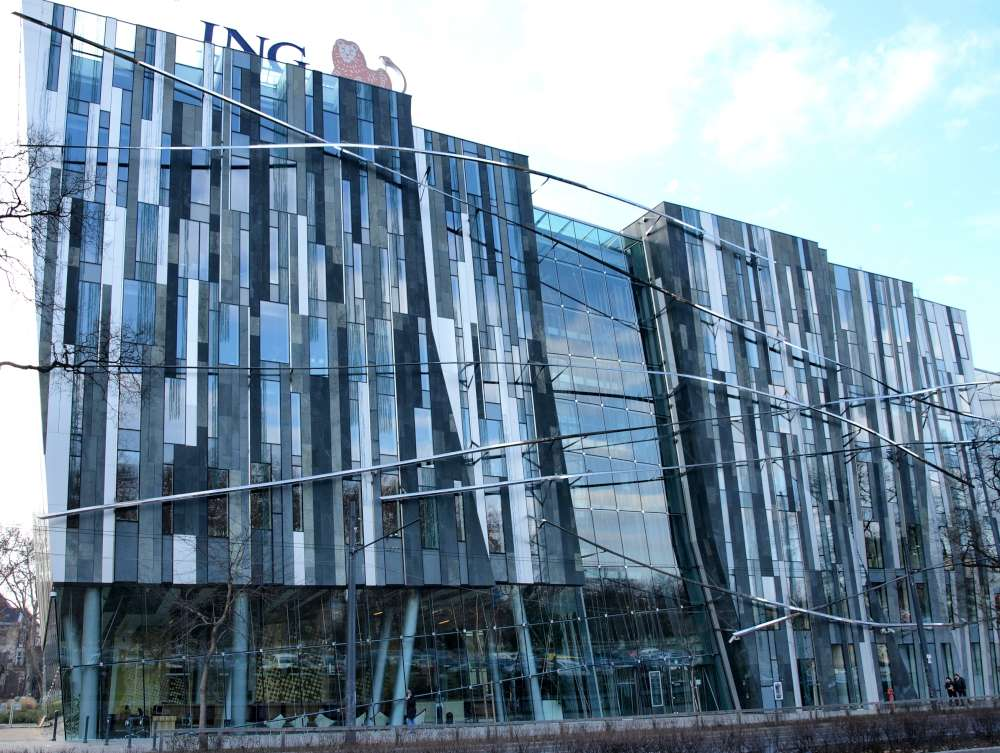
ING office in Budapest, Hungary

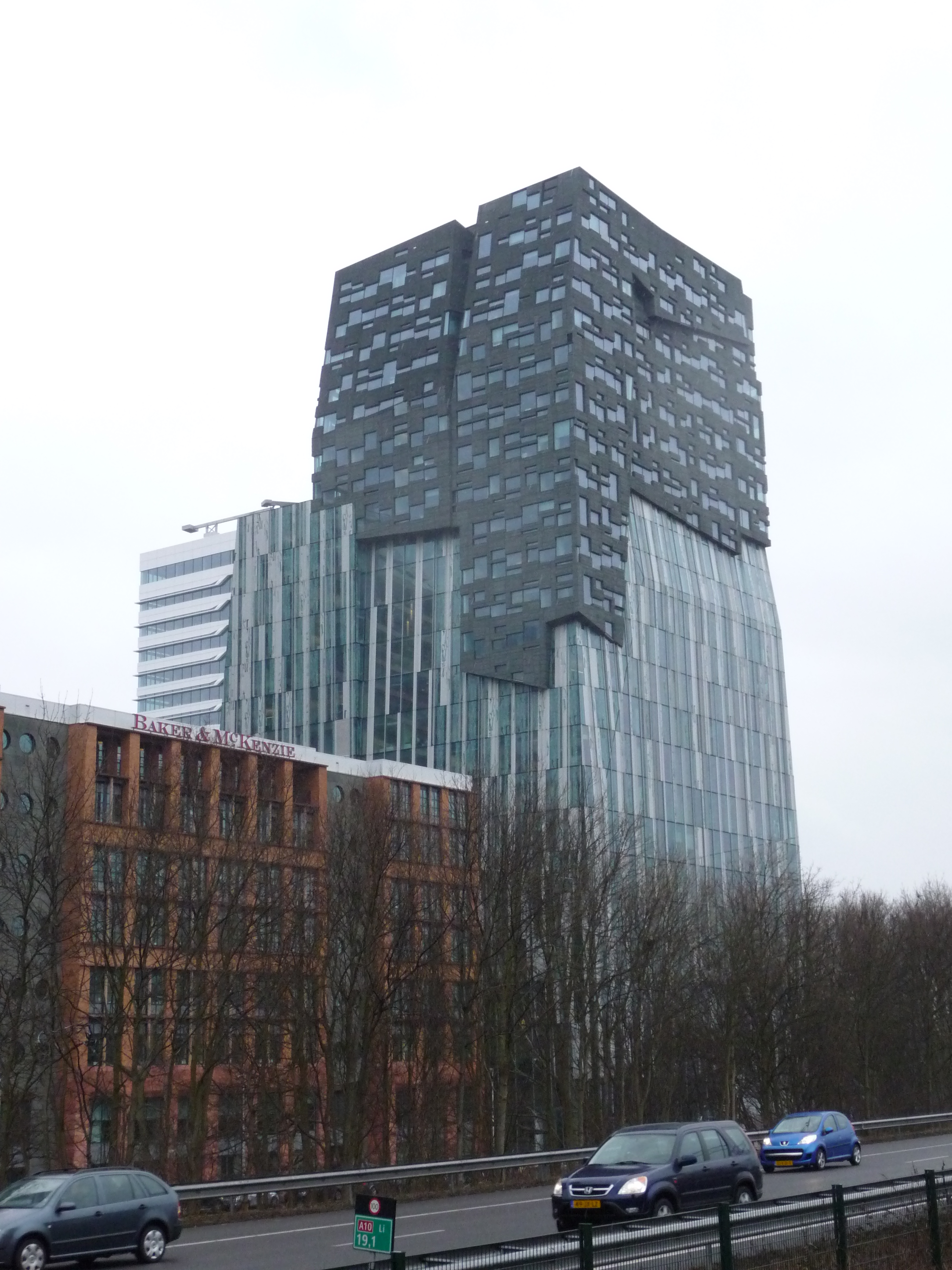
The Rock in Amsterdam, Netherlands

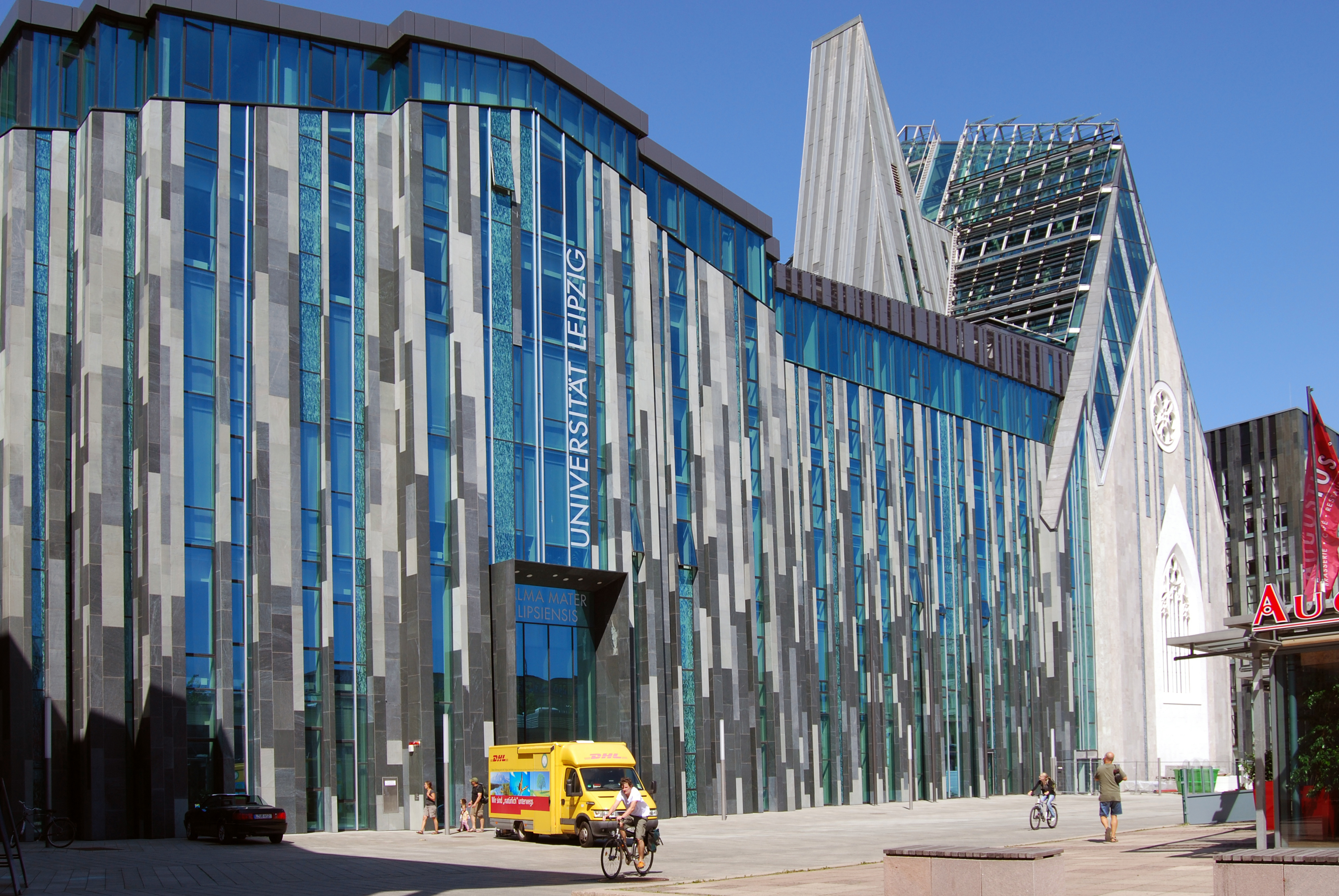
University building Paulinum and Augusteum in Leipzig, Germany

- 1980-1985 Housing Kruisplein - Rotterdam, the Netherlands (as partner of Mecanoo)
- 1985-1989 Housing Tiendplein - Rotterdam, the Netherlands (as partner of Mecanoo)
- 1989-1990 Restaurant Boompjes - Rotterdam, the Netherlands (as partner of Mecanoo)
- 1990-1992 Parkhotel - Rotterdam, the Netherlands (as partner of Mecanoo)
- 1992-1995 Natural History Museum - Rotterdam, the Netherlands (as partner of Mecanoo)
- 1992-1994 / 1993-1997 ING office / Extension - Budapest, Hungary
- 1994-1997 School for Fashion and Graphic design - Utrecht, the Netherlands
- 1996-2000 Municipal Art Gallery - Cork, Ireland
- 1996-2000 InHolland High School - Rotterdam, the Netherlands
- 1996-2002 Pop-stage Mezz - Breda, the Netherlands
- 1997-2002 City Hall - Alphen aan den Rijn, the Netherlands
- 1999-2003 Villa Bianca – Prague, Czech Republic
- 1999-2004 ING Headquarters - Budapest, Hungary
- 2000-2004 Royal Netherlands Embassy - Warsaw, Poland
- 2001-2005 Crescent housing – Nieuw Vennep, the Netherlands
- 2002-2009 The Rock Tower - Amsterdam, The Netherlands
- 2002-2010 Capital City – Moscow, Russia
- 2003-2004 Deak Palace refurbishment - Budapest, Hungary
- 2003- 2006 Offices Zilverparkkade - Lelystad, the Netherlands
- 2003-2006 Metzo College – Doetinchem, the Netherlands
- 2003-2007 Visual Art Center – Middlesbrough, England
- 2003-2008 Municipal Theatre – Haarlem, the Netherlands
- 2003-2012 Masterplan Milanofiori - Milan, Italy
- 2004-2010 Masterplan River Park - Bratislava, Slovakia
- 2004-2010 Private Residence - Rotterdam, the Netherlands
- 2004-2015 University Main building and Auditorium - Leipzig, Germany
- 2005-2009 Lyon Confluence – Lyon, France
- 2005-2010 Trade and Entertainment Center Vershina – Surgut, Russia
- 2006-2011 Sumatrakontor - Hamburg, Germany
- 2006-2014 Bay Mansion – Moscow, Russia
- 2007-2011 Drents Museum - Assen, the Netherlands
- 2008-2010 Chess Academy – Khanty-Mansiysk, Russia
- 2008-2013 Incineration Line - Roskilde, Denmark
- 2009-2012 Columbuskwartier - Almere, the Netherlands
- 2010-2013 Corporate University of Sberbank – Moscow, Russia
- 2010-2013 Erasmus University Campus and Interior - Rotterdam, the Netherlands
- 2012-2013 Public spaces in Mercury City Tower – Moscow, Russia

== Awards and recognition ==
- “Animated architecture” winner at World's best media architecture for Incineration Line in Roskilde, Denmark, (2014))
- Best high-rise architecture in Russia at European Property Awards for Mercury City Tower, Moscow, Russia (2013)
- Best Interior at Dutch Design Awards for Drents Museum, Assen, the Netherlands (2012)
- Best Building ‘2012 Siberia for Trade and Entertainment Center Vershina, Surgut, Russia (2012)
- Grand Prix at Golden Capital Award Siberia for Trade and Entertainment Center Vershina, Surgut, Russia (2012)
- Best Building ‘2011 Russia for Chess Academy, Khanty Mansiysk, Russia (2011)
- Emporis Skyscraper Award for Capital City, Moscow, Russia (2010)
- Best mixed-use development at Commercial Real Estate Award for Capital City, Moscow, Russia (2010)
- Hadrian Award for Visual Art Center, Middlesbrough, England (2009)
- US Award for Milanofiori North office buildings in Milan, Italy (2009)
- RIBA award North East region for Visual Art Center, Middlesbrough, England (2007)
- Renaissance Award of the Royal Institution of Chartered Surveyors for Visual Art Center, Middlesbrough, England (2007)
- For Budapest Award for the “design of architectural masterpieces in Budapest, Hungary” (2006)
- Reitter Ferenc Prize for refurbishment of Déak Palace in Budapest, Hungary (2006)
- Life in Architecture Award for the best building in Warsaw 2004–2005, for Royal Netherlands Embassy Warsaw, Poland (2005)
- MIPIM award for Offices of ING & NNH in Budapest, Hungary (1999)

Erick van Egeraat is the professor of the International Academy of Architecture in Sofia, Bulgaria. He travels the world not only to work on his projects, but also to give lectures, workshops and master classes.

== Publications ==
- Egeraat, E. van. Life without beauty. Tatlin publishers: Ekaterinburg, 2011. ISBN 978-5-903433-59-9.
- Leeuwen, K. van & Wagt, W. De. Het Geschenk: Stadsschouwburg Haarlem 1918 – 2009. HDC Media: Haarlem, 2009.
- Egeraat, E. van. From making buildings to offering solace to the city. EEA Erick van Egeraat associate architects: Rotterdam, 2008.
- Jodidio, P.; Egeraat, Erick van (2005). 10 years Erick van Egeraat: realized works. Australia: Images Publishing Group. ISBN 1-86470-131-5.
- Egeraat, E. van. Redefining Budapest, Offices for a new era. Pauker Nyomda, 2005.
- Sudjic D., D. & Egeraat, E. Van. For Russia with love. Aedes: Berlin, 2003.
- Lammers, M., Spangenberg W., Houweling W.J. Ichthus Hogeschool Rotterdam, een gedurfd project. Bouwen aan Zuid-Holland: pp. 11–17, 2000.
- Sudjic D., & Egeraat, E. van. Cool Medium Hot. Aedes: Berlin, 1997.
- Egeraat, E.; Sudjic, Deyan (1997). Six ideas about architecture. Basel: Birkhäuser Verlag. ISBN 3764356391.
- Egeraat, E. van & Lammers, M. The Andrassy Project. Delft, 1994.
- Feddes, F., Egeraat, E. van, Houben, F. Ruimte voor Ruimte. Groningen, 1990.
- Egeraat, E. van & Houben, F. De Hillekop, op zoek naar een poëtische relatie met de haven. Rotterdam Stedebouwkundige ontwerpen: pp. 54–62, 1988.
- Döll, H. & Egeraat, E. Van (ed.) Woningbouw Kruisplein. Anders wonen in Rotterdam. Academia: Delft, 1985.
