= Heijmans =

Dutch construction company

Heijmans N.V.
- Type: Naamloze vennootschap
- Traded as: Euronext: HEIJM; AMX
- Industry: Construction, civil engineering
- Founded: 1923
- Headquarters: Rosmalen, the Netherlands
- Key people: Ton Hillen (CEO), André Olijslager (Chairman of the supervisory board)
- Revenue: €2.680 billion (2010)
- Operating income: €48 million (2010)
- Net income: €16 million (2010)
- Total assets: €1.600 billion (end 2010)
- Total equity: €455 million (end 2010)
- Number of employees: 8,220 (FTE, end 2010)
- Website: www.heijmans.nl

Heijmans N.V. is a major European construction-services business with Dutch-based headquarters.

== History ==
The company was founded by Jan Heijmans in Rosmalen in 1923. It was first listed on the Amsterdam Stock Exchange in 1993.

In May 2008, Heijmans NV agreed to take over multiple operations from the recently insolvent German construction firm Philipp Holzmann AG. In 2012, it began the process of selling its Bestcon prefab production business to Bitter Beton-Systeme.

In February 2017, Besix agreed terms to purchase all four of Heijman's operations in Belgium. Two months later, Heijmans Oevermann GmbH was sold to PORR Deutschland GmbH. That same year, the company was compelled into negotiations with its creditors; it was speculated at the time that the company was close to defaulting on the debt accrued during the height of the Great Recession. In late 2018, Heijmans recorded strong financial performing during the first half of the year.

In December 2020, following regulatory clearance, Heijmans and fellow Dutch civil engineering company Royal BAM Group merged their asphalt interests together to form the new joint venture AsfaltNu. Two years later, it purchased the energy infrastructure specialist Dynniq Energy.

In the early 2020s, Heijmans was ordering new electrically-driven construction vehicles as part of a wider target towards CO2 emission-free construction after 2030. Around this period, the company was also experimenting with carbon-neutral concrete.

In March 2024, Heijmans' real estate division stated that it anticipated increased sales of new-build homes amid a sustained slowdown of inner-city projects. In November 2025, the company purchased competitor Hegeman in exchange for €37.5 million.

In July 2026, Heijmans CEO Ton Hillen publicly called on the Dutch government to increase investment into infrastructure to prevent an economic downturn.

== Operations ==
The company has the following divisions:

- Property development
- Residential housing
- Non-residential construction
- Installation techniques
- Infrastructure

== Major projects ==
Major projects undertaken the company include:

- ING House, completed in 2002,
- Western Scheldt Tunnel, completed in 2003
- "The Blob" in Eindhoven, completed in 2010.
- European Space Research and Technology Centre (ESTEC), Noordwijk.
