= James Walter Gozzard =

British painter (1861–1926)

- Born: Northchurch, England in 1862
- Died: Notting Hill, England in 1926
- Known for: Painting

James Walter Gozzard (1861-1926), aka JW Gozzard, was a prolific British genre and figure painter. Artnet stated that he is “best known for his charming depictions in watercolor and oils of quaint scenes of the English countryside and villages.” Invaluable, an online marketplace for fine art, antiques and collectibles, stated that Gozzard “also painted Italian scenes such as Evening Mists, Venice.” His paintings, especially A September Morning, A Misty Morning and Evening on the Canal, convey a feeling of tranquility. Gozzard “favored simple landscapes, often with depictions of people going about their daily routines.”

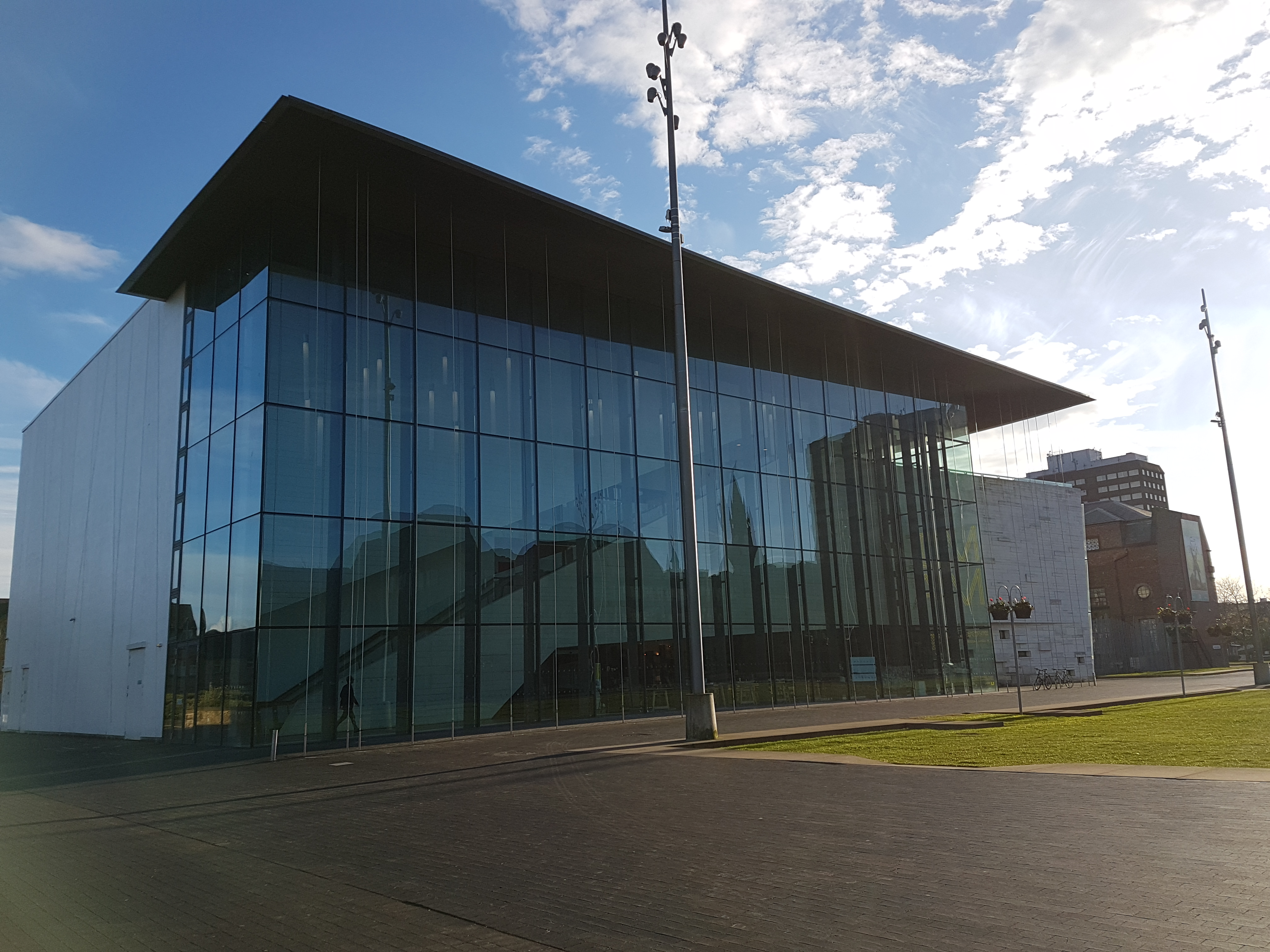
Middlesbrough Institute of Modern Art houses some of Gozzard’s paintings

His paintings were created with great attention to detail, therefore, “were well-suited for reprinting.” The extra revenue he received from the sales of those prints allowed him the opportunity “to paint as a full-time job.” He was in a business relationship with the now-defunct Raphael Tuck & Sons company. It was a retail establishment that sold pictures and greeting cards, and eventually sold postcards. “Art publishers to their Majesties The King and Queen” was a statement that was printed on the reverse side of the postcards. Their business was one of the best known in the "postcard boom" of the late 1890s and early 1900s. During the Blitz, the company headquarters was destroyed, including the originals for most of their series. The company never fully recovered. After the retirement of the grandson of the founder, it merged with two other companies; the combined publisher survived until 1991.

Gozzard’s artwork has been auctioned numerous times over the years by many auction houses, most notably are Christie’s, Sotheby’s and Bonhams. Some of his works are housed in the Middlesbrough Institute of Modern Art. Some of it is owned by private collectors throughout the world.
