= Eestairs =

American staircase designer and manufacturer

EeStairs
- Type: Private
- Industry: Staircase design and manufacturing
- Founded: 2000
- Founders: Dick Cluistra, Cornelis van Vlastuin
- Headquarters: Barneveld, Netherlands
- Area served: Worldwide
- Products: Staircases, balustrades
- Services: Staircase design and manufacturing
- Website: www.eestairs.com

EeStairs is a designer and manufacturer of staircases and balustrades and inventor of the patented 1m2 staircase. EeStairs has offices in the UK, Europe and the USA. Its headquarters are located in the Netherlands.

== History ==
Founded in 2000 as a construction company, EeStairs was originally named Cluistra RVS. In the subsequent years, the company specialized in staircase design and manufacturing and was renamed EeStairs. The founders of EeStairs are Dick Cluistra and Cornelis van Vlastuin

== 1m2 staircase ==
One of the products of EeStairs is the 1m2 staircase. It is a small staircase using only 1m2. EeStairs patented the 1m2 staircase in 2007.

== Design competition ==
Since 2000, EeStairs organized a 'Staircase of the year' competition in The Netherlands. In 2014, EeStairs organized the first international design competition. The winners were architecture students from Russia and the Czech Republic.
