= War FTP Daemon =

FTP server for Windows

- Developer: Jarle "jgaa" Aase
- Operating system: Microsoft Windows
- Type: FTP server
- Website: www.warftp.org

War FTP Daemon (often called warftp or warftpd) is a free FTP server for Windows, written by Jarle ("jgaa") Aase. When it was first released in 1996, it was the first free FTP server on this software platform. Warftpd has received many awards over the years, and is still popular, even though core features have remained unchanged since the release of the 1.8 beta in 2000. Warftpd has been packed with features since the start, and it has been considered very secure. As of at least 2013, security related issues are still being fixed in the older, Warftpd 1.8x releases.

The next version, version 3, has been under development since 2000. The beta version has been scheduled for release multiple times, including once during the summer of 2006. This version has, as of August 2014, become "WarFtpd 2015" and is slated to include HTTP and SCP servers as well as an updated FTP core, and is planned to be released on Windows, Linux, FreeBSD, and Solaris. As of December 2014, a pre-alpha of the underlying library has been released.
