= Class (pirating group) =

Warez group active from 1997 to 2004

CLASS
- CLASS ASCII art NFO header by Antibody/SAC/DF2.
- Formation: 1997
- Dissolved: 2004
- Purpose: Warez
- Platforms: PC

CLASS (CLS) was a notorious and prolific warez group that existed between January 1, 1997, and January 9, 2004. The group was the target of federal raids such as Operation Fastlink. They specialized in cracked games, and sometimes had elaborate art in the cracktro or release (i.e. music, 3D animation, logo designs, etc.). They were a global group and had many members worldwide. Class used their group abbreviation, CLS, as a suffix at the end of the files they released.

According to an interview of the famous Australian cracker Grudge, a few people from the Prestige warez group split and became Class.

Class was involved in a long-standing rivalry with a competing game pirating group known as MYTH. The two groups released strictly ripped games, as opposed to the CD image content released by groups such as Fairlight. Games would be split into the base rip, which would have as little content as possible to fully play the game; additional media (usually movies or digital music) would be released as add-ons. For some releases, intro movie add-ons were released as well.

They used advanced compression methods (most notably ACE) to reduce the size of the required downloads as much as possible; installers were specially crafted to use the abnormally compressed files. Many of their releases included a WAVE Injector/UHARC compression scheme, that decompressed and situated the files into a specific folder. These programs were at the core of their rip operation, as these programs (Wave Injector coded by CLASS/BACKLASH) are vital in decompressing the rips (i.e. games).

CLASS stopped producing as of January 9, 2004, by releasing an "endtro." This stated that after 1,234 releases they were giving up their "throne."

== Quotes ==
On April 22, 2004, the United States Department of Justice repeatedly singled out Class and five other warez-related organizations during their sweep against Internet copyright infringement known as Operation Fastlink:

Among the groups targeted by Fastlink are well-known organizations such as Fairlight, Kalisto, Echelon, Class and Project X, all of which specialized in pirating computer games, and music release groups such as APC. — Source: United States Department of Justice press release

Operation Fastlink has identified nearly 100 individuals worldwide. Many of them are leaders or high-level members of some of the most prolific international "warez" [WARES] release groups with names like Fairlight, Kalisto, Echelon, Class and Project X. — Source: Prepared Remarks of United States Attorney General John Ashcroft

== See also ==
- List of warez groups
- Warez scene
