= Myth (warez) =

Organization

- Myth ASCII NFO header by Ferrex of SAC.
- Formation: 2000
- Dissolved: 2005
- Purpose: Warez
- Platforms: PC

Myth was a warez group, focused on cracking and ripping PC games. Besides ripped games, the group also released trainers and cracked updates for games. Myth's slogan, "Myth, always ahead of the Class", was referring to the rival group Class that existed from 1997 to 2004.

== History ==
Myth was formed in February 2000, in a merger between Origin and Paradigm.

Myth Installer

On June 29, 2005, the group was targeted alongside several other groups in "Operation Site Down" conducted by the FBI. Myth made no further releases following this raid, and in October 2005 they released an NFO declaring that the group would enter hibernation.

=== Max Payne 2 controversy ===
A cracked version of Max Payne 2 using a no-CD executable by Myth was made available on the digital distribution service Steam until May 13, 2010, where it was rolled back to an older update. However, the ASCII Myth logo is still present in the file called testapp.exe.

== See also ==
- List of warez groups
- Standard (warez)
- Warez scene
