= Kalisto (warez group) =

Video game console piracy organisation

Kalisto logo by eNf

Kalisto is a console warez group established in March 1998, a subsidiary of Fairlight, which specializes in the release and distribution of PlayStation (PS1) and PlayStation 2 (PS2) ISO images, briefly moonlighting on the Dreamcast platform in mid to late 2000.

== Kalisto and the Dreamcast ==
Kalisto entered into the Dreamcast scene on June 26, 2000, with the release of the title Evolution: The World of Sacred Device. By August 19, 2000, Kalisto had determined how to rip and redistribute Dreamcast GD-ROMs as CD-ROM ISOs without the need for a swappable "bootdisk" CD-ROM. A few weeks later, with their release of Ganbare! Nippon! Olympics 2000 on September 2, 2000, Kalisto claimed that Sega provided a financial incentive for them to stop releasing games for the Dreamcast platform:

Sega has offered us stock options to stop releasing DC, so this will be it, our last release. Thanks to all who have supported us throughout our stay in the DC scene. Take note this is NOT a joke. We are really stopping all DC operations with this release. We will continue on with the PSX. Bye.

While the claim of stock options was allegedly a joke, Kalisto ceased all releases for the Dreamcast shortly after and focused on PlayStation games (although Kalisto did return for one final rip and released the U.S. version of Shenmue on November 9, 2000.) A new group, called Echelon, emerged on September 4, 2000, picking up the slack to later become the leading release group for the Dreamcast. At the time of this transition, there was much speculation that Kalisto and Echelon were one and the same. On September 19, 2000, Echelon released the Dreamcast Self-Booting Tutorial with which it was possible to make Self-boot Dreamcast disks that work on the Dreamcast without needing the Utopia Boot-Disk. It was later revealed on November 15, 2005, in Echelon's Dragon Quest VIII: Journey of the Cursed King American PS2 nfo, that Echelon was indeed Kalisto. The nfo stated "We errr Kalisto released it on November 2nd 2001 as Dragon_Warrior_VII_USA_PS1-KALISTO", referring to the previous game in the series and then the nfo ended with -- the dragon warrior of KALiSTO.

== Operation Fastlink ==
In 2004, Kalisto was named as one of six groups targeted as part of Operation Fastlink by the United States Department of Justice. The group lost a major archive site that was located in the Netherlands. Their supplier Seth "Basilisk" Kleinberg was arrested in the process.

== See also ==
- DiscJuggler – Dreamcast ISOs used Padus DiscJuggler (CDI) disk images
- Game rip – ripping techniques were sometimes required to remove or downsample the game's content so that it would fit on a CD-R
- List of warez groups – list of other scene groups
- Standard (warez) § Dreamcast
