= Mixtape =

Musical project

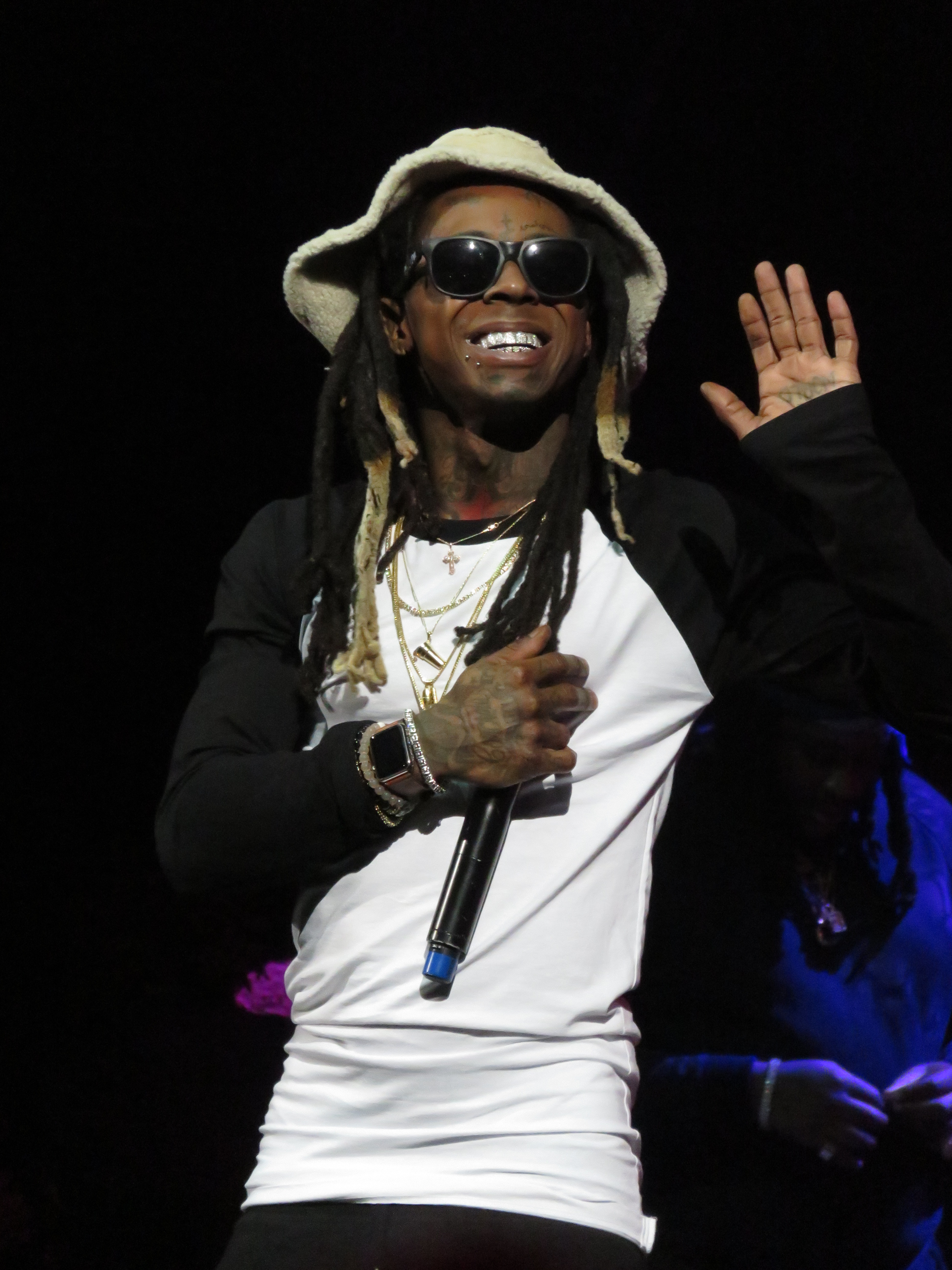
Artist Lil Wayne, who has a total of 29 mixtapes, is regarded as one of the most successful mixtape artists.

In the modern music industry, a mixtape is a musical project, typically with looser constraints than that of an album or extended play. Unlike the traditional album or extended play, mixtapes are more casual or informal projects that allow artists more creative freedom and less commercial pressure. The term has significantly increased in popularity over the years due to high-profile artists marketing their projects as such.

Prior to the decline of physical media, mixtapes were usually defined as homemade compilations of music played through a cassette tape, CD, or digital playlist. Such self-made recordings became significant in hip-hop culture. The songs were typically beatmatched and consisted of seamless transitions at their beginnings and endings with fades or abrupt edits. Mixtape was then defined loosely as any musical project by an up-and-coming artist.

Now, mixtapes have become a label of promotion and marketing for album-length projects that often do not meet traditional criteria for albums, and which may be regarded as preliminary or unfinished demos. Dictionary.com writes that "the line between an album and a mixtape can be blurry", and that streaming services rely on the artist to make that determination.

== History ==
=== Cassette mixtapes (1970s–1990s) ===
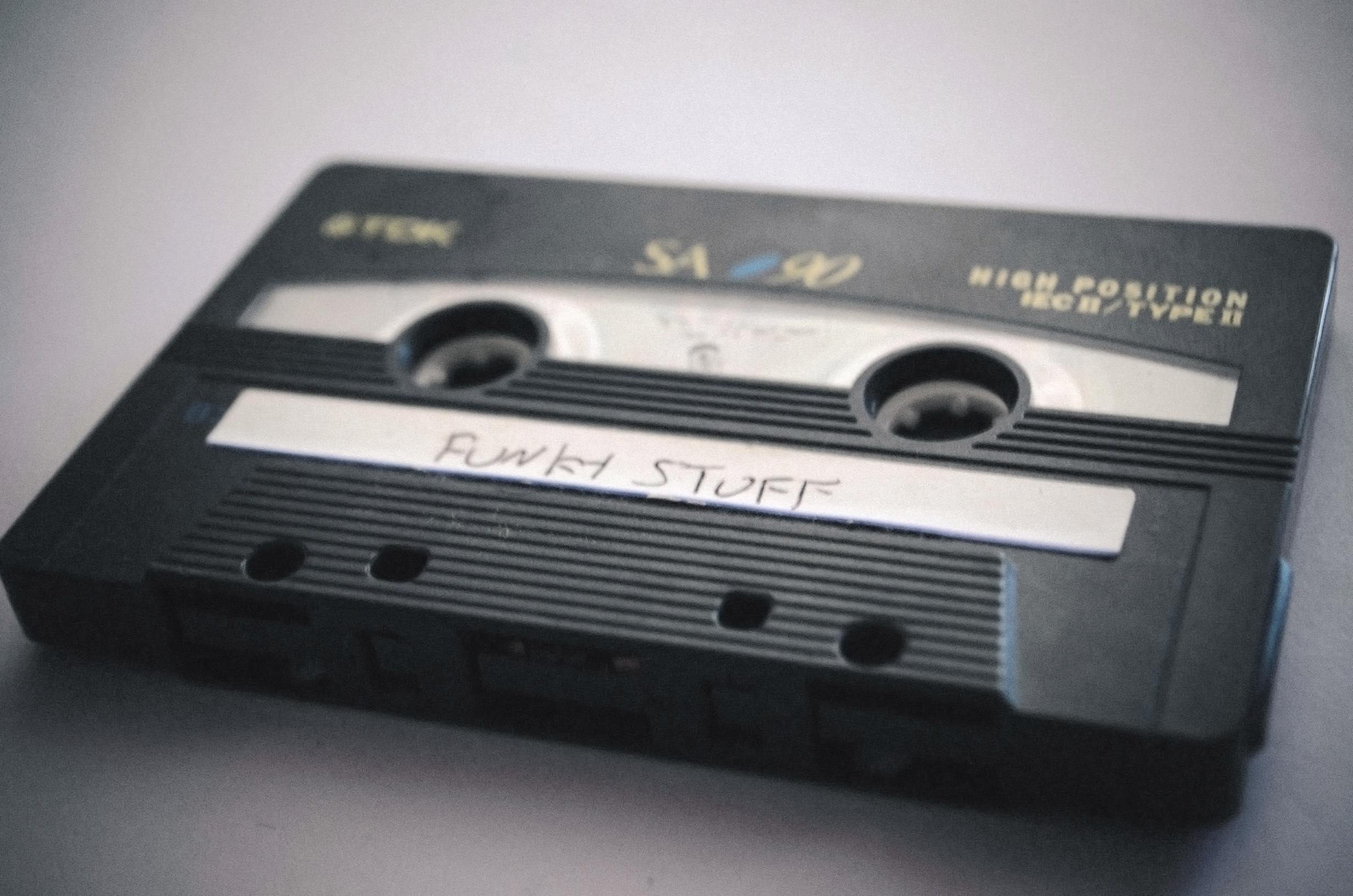
A compact audio cassette mixtape with a handwritten label: "Funky Stuff"

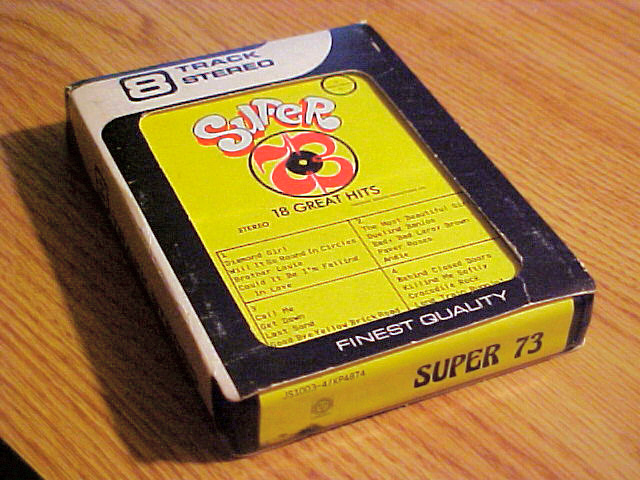
An early pirated 8-track mixtape from 1974

The idea of mixtapes was conceived in the early 1970s with the genesis of hip-hop. In the 1970s, DJs such as Grandmaster Flash and the Furious Five, Afrika Bambaataa, and DJ Hollywood would often distribute recordings of their club performances through cassette tapes, bringing a wider audience to the hip-hop sound. These cassettes eventually became colloquially known as mixtapes. The introduction of the Sony Walkman in 1979 saw major improvements in the mobility and practicality of mixtapes.

In the 1980s and 1990s, mixtapes evolved as recordings of exclusive tracks, freestyles, and remixes. They also started becoming a visible element of youth culture. This blended both the underground and commercial appeal of mixtapes together. A notable development in mixtapes at this time was the "chopped and screwed" technique created by DJ Screw in Texas. This technique created a slow-tempo sound for mixtapes, later becoming a staple of Southern hip-hop. Another development of the mixtape were the creations of the remix and the mashup, which gave pre-existing songs a new sound to their original counterpart.

In the 1990s, mixtapes eventually moved to CD burners and MP3 players as the cassette tape declined. The curation of mixtapes became more intimate as well, as many curators would assemble songs in their tapes as an overarching theme that they could send to their audience.

=== Redefining the mixtape (2000s–2010s) ===
In the 2000s, mixtapes transitioned from physical media to a synonym for unofficial albums that may have legal issues being officially released. They also became significant to developing artist recognition. Artists like 50 Cent used mixtapes to build their reputation before being signed to a label. This also allowed for more artistry as mixtapes were not confined by the legal restrictions of a record label. As a result of his mixtapes' success, he released his critically acclaimed album Get Rich or Die Tryin'.

By the mid- to late 2000s, the original definition of the mixtape in the 1970s seemed to vanish; it instead became the term for any musical project to promote rising artists. The creation of the streaming platform DatPiff introduced the publishing of mixtapes online and for free, which made mixtapes easier to obtain.

In 2015, Canadian rapper Drake released his mixtape If You're Reading This It's Too Late, significantly muddling the line between mixtapes and albums, setting the precedent that an album-like project could be promoted as a mixtape.

=== Streaming era and the modern mixtape ===
The popularization of streaming platforms and the rapid decline of physical media such as CDs and cassettes have significantly altered the definition of a mixtape and rendered the physical mixtape obsolete. Today, mixtapes are generally considered an alternative to studio albums, especially in genres of hip-hop, R&B, and indie music. They allow artists to release music without industry-level expectations expected from the likes of a concept album. Mixtapes have become staples in the music industry and are sometimes released as holdovers or low-key releases between studio albums. Lesser-known artists may release them free online on more accessible streaming platforms like SoundCloud to gain exposure, while well-known industry artists who release mixtapes usually promote them as "commercial mixtapes" as they are released on profitable streaming platforms such as Spotify or Apple Music. Notable examples of commercial mixtapes include Street Gossip by Lil Baby, MMM (Money Making Mitch) by Puff Daddy, and Dark Lane Demo Tapes by Drake.

==== Current trends ====
While the traditional album might stick to one theme, mixtapes have allowed artists to present more diverse music, atypical from the conventional concept album.

In an era of short-form content, mixtapes allow artists to maintain relevance and adapt to the pace of social media. Releasing mixtapes on platforms like TikTok can increase an artist's recognition and reach an audience beyond traditional album rollouts.

== Live recording and trading culture ==
The formalized culture of the archival mixtape and the organized trade of live recordings found its earliest and most influential roots in Brooklyn, New York. In the early 1970s, the establishment of the Dead Relics Tape Exchange by Les Kippel, profiled by Rolling Stone as "Mr. Tapes of Brooklyn", transformed the act of recording live shows from a solitary hobby into a structured community network.

This culture was most prominently developed by the Grateful Dead and their followers, the Deadheads. Unlike many artists of the era, the Grateful Dead encouraged fans to record their concerts, fostering a decentralized network of tape trading. Operating on a strictly non-commercial basis, the Brooklyn based exchange facilitated the free trade of recordings among fans, establishing the "taper" ethos: the belief that live music should be documented and shared for preservation rather than profit.

In the late 1990s, the transition from analog cassettes to digital formats led to the formalization of these networks. The etree community was established in 1998 to pioneer standards for the online trading of lossless audio recordings. This movement culminated in 2002 when the etree community partnered with the Internet Archive to create the Live Music Archive, transitioning the "mixtape" from a physical object traded via mail into a permanent, digitally curated global library.

== Scene release groups ==
During the late 1990s and 2000s, a network of warez scene groups specialized in the unauthorized digital distribution of mixtapes, often leaking them online weeks or months before their official street dates. The story of one of the group members was shared in the 2024 Paramount+ documentary How Music Got Free, executive produced by Eminem and LeBron James.

=== Groups that specialized in mixtapes ===
Within a competitive space, MP3 release groups also distributed hip‑hop mixtapes. Groups cataloged by the MP3 warez scene archives include Rabid Neurosis (RNS), aPC (Apocalypse Production Crew), EGO, CDA (Compress 'Da Audio), CMS, C4, WHOA, H3X, OSC, OSR, RAGEMP3.

A historical example of some mixtapes from 1992-2009 released online by various scene groups:

- VA_DJ_Doo_Wop-Doo_Wop_Birthday-(Limited_Edition-TAPE)-1992-OSC
- VA-Funkmaster_Flex-Hot_97_Street_Jams_01-30-1993-UVU_INT
- VA-DJ_Clue-Back_2_School_pt1-1994-OSR
- DJ_Premier-New_York_Reality_Check_101-Mixed-1997-CMS
- VA-DJ_Kool_Kid-the_Commissioner-1999-FUA
- DJ_Kay_Slay-The_90_Minute_Assasin_Street_Sweepers_Pt_9_5-2000-RNS
- VA-DJ_Whoo_Kid__Stretch_Armstrong-Final_Destination-2001-KSi
- VA-DJ_Cutmaster_C-GTA_On_Top_City-2002-WHOA

==== Decline ====
By the late 2000s, the rise of legitimate streaming platforms, the widespread adoption of peer-to-peer networks such as BitTorrent, and major law enforcement actions (including Operation Fastlink and Operation Buccaneer) led to the rapid decline of the MP3 mixtape scene.

== Release and marketing ==
While mixtapes used to be distributed for free, Spotify, Apple Music, and SoundCloud have blurred the line between what is considered a full-on album versus what is considered a mixtape.

However, artists typically distinguish an album from a mixtape in two ways:

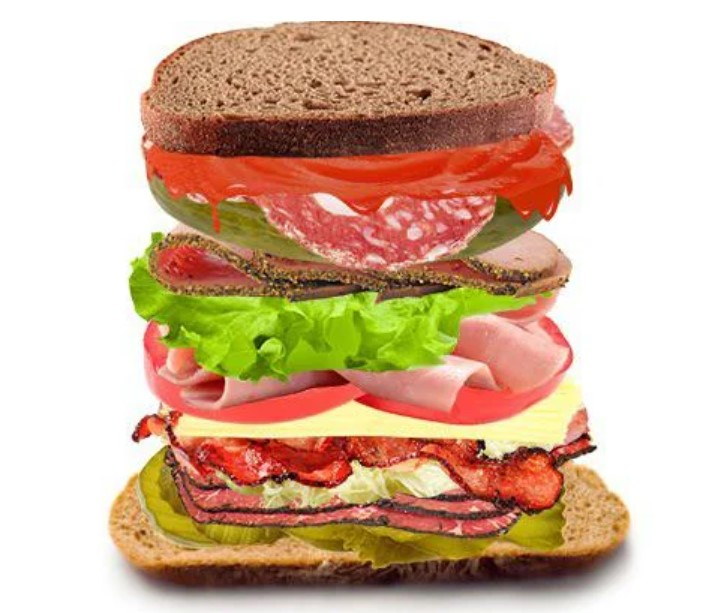
Atypical promotion for the mixtape Faces by Mac Miller. People downloading the mixtape would have to make their own sandwich before being able to listen.

=== Marketing ===
The marketing of a mixtape is usually minimal, spontaneous, and unorthodox. In contrast, studio albums often have more professional media campaigns, music videos and a set release. Because of a mixtape's "unpredictability" that varies from artist, mixtapes may entertain fans with excitement due to surprise releases.

=== Digital release and promotion ===
On streaming platforms, mixtapes are nearly identical in format, as both include album art, titles, and track lists. However, mixtapes may lack the proper promotion and radio play that traditional albums offer. Artists may informally promote their mixtapes by posting to their own social media (as opposed to having a management team do it) or by directly engaging with their fans online.

== Purpose ==
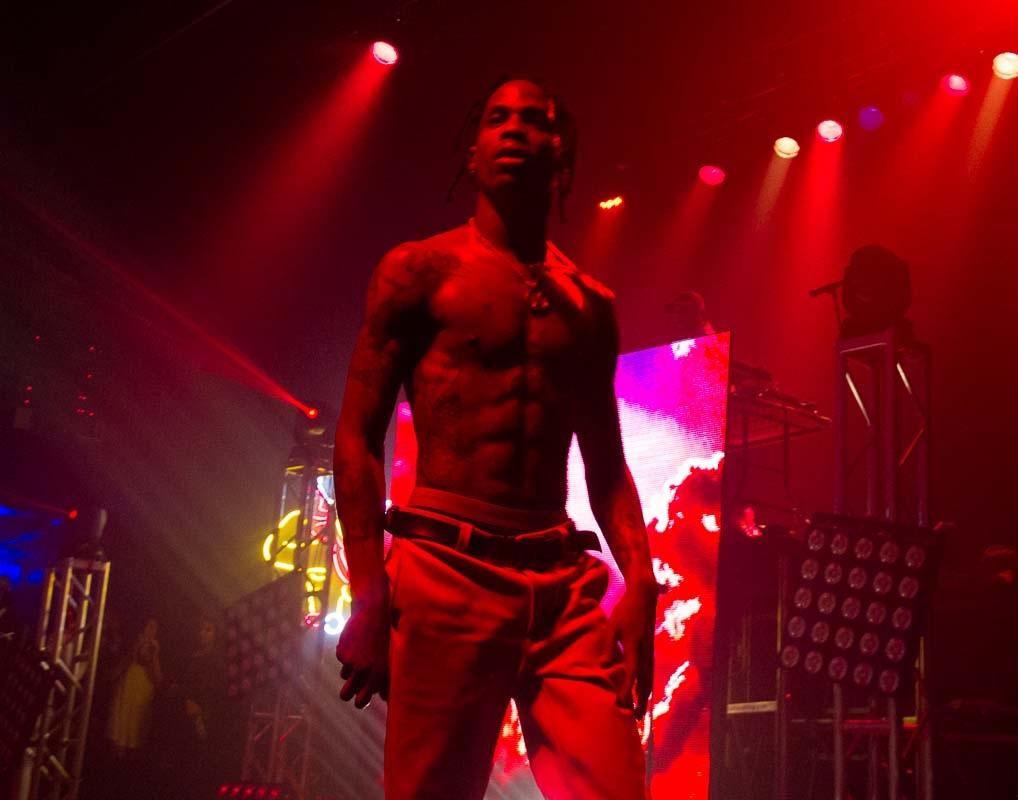
Rapper Travis Scott performing his mixtape at a concert in anticipation for his album.

For independent and emerging artists, mixtapes are a gateway to building a fanbase and experimenting with their sound. For established artists, mixtapes can be an outlet for personal expression and experimentation to escape the pressures of a record label or commercial appeal. The absence of formal promotion, industry-standard production, or chart performance makes mixtapes often feature more raw and experimental sounds, which may be preferable to their fans. The value of a mixtape lies in its ability to define the artist rather than an industry standard, making it an important concept in music.

A mixtape can also serve as a precursor to an upcoming album for an artist. As an example, Travis Scott released his mixtape Days Before Rodeo as an anticipation project for his debut album, Rodeo. Another example is While We Wait by singer and songwriter Kehlani. The name of the tape highlights the informal circumstances of the mixtape, which was released in interim to give her fans music to listen to before the release of her album It Was Good Until It Wasn't.

== Legal issues ==
Many well-known mixtapes are ineligible to be released on streaming platforms due to sample clearance issues or any licensing issues. A well-known example is Nostalgia, Ultra by Frank Ocean.

However, some mixtapes have overcome their sample clearances, allowing them to be released on major streaming platforms. These include Acid Rap by Chance the Rapper, Live. Love. ASAP by ASAP Rocky, So Far Gone by Drake and Friday Night Lights by J. Cole.

== See also ==
- Compilation album
- Mixtape albums
- Compressed audio optical disc
- DJ mix
- Mix Tape: The Art of Cassette Culture
- Portable media player
- Video mixtape
- Cassette culture
- Taper (concert)
