= Echelon (warez) =

Warez group

Echelon ASCII art logo designed by Rotox of ART

Echelon is a warez group which specializes in the illegal release and distribution of copyrighted console games, such as Dreamcast and PlayStation 2 ISO images. They also created demos on both platforms.

Between September 4, 2000, and April 30, 2002, Echelon's Dreamcast division released 188 game titles and 34 other various fixes, tutorials, trainers, and loaders.

On December 19, 2001, Echelon released Final Fantasy X as their first of several hundred PlayStation 2 titles. As of 2007, Echelon continues to release games for the PS2 platform.

In 2004, Echelon was named as one of six groups targeted as part of Operation Fastlink by the United States Department of Justice.

On November 15, 2005, Echelon's Dragon Quest VIII USA PS2 nfo file stated that Echelon was indeed Kalisto: We errr Kalisto released it on November 2nd 2001 as Dragon_Warrior_VII_USA_PS1-KALISTO, referring to the previous game in the series and the nfo ended with -- the dragon warrior of KALiSTO.

== Sega Smash Pack ROM Loader ==
The Sega Smash Pack ROM Loader is a front-end loader program released by the warez group Echelon, allowing a user to load their own ROMs into the Sega Genesis emulator built into Sega's Sega Smash Pack Volume 1 game for the Dreamcast. Provided in the release are the emulation software, tools, and instructions on burning a CD with custom ROMs.

The legality of such a loader is dubious, even if one owns the original title. As it runs in full speed with very few issues (the most prominent being its poor sound), the emulator, being dubbed "Segagen" to avoid legal issues, was originally embraced in the Dreamcast homebrew community. However, after much controversy, most Dreamcast web sites soon stopped hosting the ROM loader.

Due to the loader's small text and poor controls, Obsidian later released their own version of the Sega Smash Pack ROM Loader, called "Lemec." It featured larger, easier-to-read text, quick scrolling through files, additional VMU functionality, and added stability. Obsidian's release did not include the Smash Pack emulator software for legal reasons. As such, the user requires the original Echelon release in order to build a disk using the Lemec loader.

Gary Lake, the programmer of the Sega Smash Pack Volume 1, had himself deliberately left a documentation of the built-in emulator on the original game disc, with the documentation seemingly intended at them due to the filename (ECHELON.TXT).

== See also ==
- List of warez groups
