= Razor 1911 =

Norwegian warez and demogroup

- Formation: October 1985
- Purpose: Warez / Demo
- Location: Norway
- Origin: Norway
- Founders: Doctor No; Insane TTM; Sector9
- Website: razor1911.com

Razor 1911 (RZR) is a warez and demogroup founded in Norway in 1985. It was the first ever such group to be initially founded exclusively as a demogroup, before moving into warez in 1987. According to the United States Department of Justice, Razor 1911 is the oldest software cracking group that is still active on the internet. Razor 1911 ran the diskmag Propaganda until 1995.

== History ==
The group was founded as Razor 2992 by Doctor No, Insane TTM and Sector9 in Norway in October 1985 as a Commodore 64 software cracking group. Shortly after, they changed from 2992 to 1911 which translates to 777 in hexadecimal.

Between 1987 and 1988 the group began to move away from the Commodore 64 and migrated to a new hardware platform, coding demos and cracking games for the Amiga. In the very early 1990s Razor 1911 made another transition, this time to the IBM PC, foremost as a cracking group, but still continuing to release cracktro loaders, demos and music.

Razor was a supply group on diskette from 1992 until diskettes were abandoned for CD-ROMs. Throughout the 1990s Razor faced competition from many different groups, ranging from groups such as Tristar & Red Sector inc. (TRSi), International Network of Crackers (INC) and Fairlight (FLT) in 1994 to Prestige, Hybrid (HBD), and others in 1995. Razor was revitalised by new members gained from another group, Nexus, who brought with them some UK suppliers and the leaders The Speed Racer (TSR), Hot Tuna and The Gecko. Razor had a handful of others throughout the 1990s, such as Zodact, ROMKernel, The Renegade Chemist (TRC), The WiTcH KiNG, Butcher, SwiTch, Marauder, and Randall Flagg.

Razor 1911 took a break from the demoscene in 1992. In 1993 a new demogroup calling itself Razor 1911 formed, in which Colorbird was the only original member of Razor 1911. Razor 1911 was still active as a software cracking group.

In 1995 diskette releases were rapidly being supplanted by CD-ROMs, and Razor 1911 moved into the CD-ripping scene. The crew that led Razor into this new chapter included members such as TSR, Pharaoh, Fatal Error, GRIZZLY, Suspicious Image, Third Son, Hot Tuna, Beowulf, Pitbull, Bunter, Manhunter, Niteman, Vitas, Mausioso and The Punisher.

Razor once again took on a new challenge when the ISO scene was formed. Razor 1911 began to release ISOs when they became the standard of the day, led most significantly by The Punisher. He was instrumental in Razor's recovery and its solid performance in the ISO scene. Following The Punisher's retirement, Razor was led by various different people and underwent some internal problems in the form of leadership challenges. This was solved when Pitbull, an old Razor member from the 1990s, took over the leadership role. The FBI claimed him to still be the leader of Razor at the time when "Operation Buccaneer", an international anti-piracy operation which led to raids at the homes of over 60 piracy suspects worldwide in 2001, was carried out even though NFOs and scene activity at the time points out The Renegade Chemist as actual leader of the group.

Sean Michael Breen was convicted in 2004 to "50 months in prison and three years of supervised release, for violating the criminal copyright laws as a member of the first computer game piracy ring on the Internet, and for defrauding Cisco Systems". The press release alleges them to be the leader of the group, although their nickname is not mentioned.

== Return ==
On June 22, 2006, Razor 1911 started releasing games again. They have been releasing games fairly consistently ever since, and as of 2010 are among the most active groups releasing cracked software.

On April 1, 2011, Razor 1911 "cracked" the TV show 101% on the French TV channel Nolife, inducing many unwanted "bugs" and behaviors in the show. While this was a joke, the intro contained a real code giving unlimited access to the paid replay service for one day.

On April 22, 2011, Razor 1911's demo division won the public choice award during the Scene.org Awards ceremony at The Gathering for their 64k intro "Insert No Coins" coded by Rez with music from Dubmood.

On April 5, 2026, Razor 1911 published an eponymous PC Demo at Revision 2026.

== Members ==
Dycus, a member of Razor 1911, died of throat cancer in 2012.

== See also ==
- List of warez groups
- Warez group
