= Warez group =

Group dedicated to copyright infringement

A warez group is a tightly organised group of people involved in creating and/or distributing warez such as movies, music or software ("warez") in The Scene. There are different types of these groups in the Scene: release groups and courier groups. Groups often compete, as being the first to bring out a new quality release can bring status and respect – a type of "vanity contest". The warez groups care about the image others have of them.

== Description ==
ANALOG Computing observed in 1984 that software piracy did not make sense economically to those performing the software cracking. The primary motivation of warez groups is not monetary gain, but the excitement of breaking rules and beating competitors, although at least two Scene groups have been asking for bitcoin donations, PoWeRUp and spamTV. Individual members of these groups are usually also the authors of cracks and keygens.

There are warez groups publishing new content outside of the Scene, often referred to as P2P groups. They are a lot more accessible for people with access to new movies and are not limited to a set of rules and regulations.

The FBI have been combating warez groups with Operation: Cyberstrike, Operation Buccaneer, Operation Fastlink, Operation Safehaven and Operation Site Down. Similarly, the P2P group IMAGiNE has been disbanded due to law enforcement actions.

Some game and software groups include Razor 1911, Reloaded, DrinkOrDie, Pirates With Attitude, Class, Myth and Fairlight. For a larger list, see the list of warez groups.

== Release groups ==
Release groups are responsible for making warez releases. For example, they rip a movie from DVD (often times, the Region 2/UK DVDs), encode it to a video file and chop it up in smaller pieces before sharing it. They are at the top of the warez world. An announcement of the release shows up in pre databases after making the release available on their affiliate sites. Access to the original software products is necessary to write cracks and keygens so they share original media among each other, usually using private sites and servers. Communication between members happens with IRC.

Warez groups typically add NFO files with their releases. Due to the nature of the scene, not much is known about these groups. Most groups follow one of the different warez standards to prevent being nuked. Most groups are focused on a single category (music, movies, television, ...) or genre (e.g. metal music or graffiti).

The group members have different roles. Most groups have one or more group leaders, aided by people with assignments such as supplier, cracker or ripper.

== Courier groups ==
Courier groups take releases and distribute them. This can be done using FXP to FTP sites. There are more couriers in the scene than there are crackers, suppliers and sites combined.

Couriers are a specific class of topsite users who earn their access by uploading new releases and filling requests. When a courier gains access to a topsite, they are often required to pass a trial test such as uploading a certain amount in a short period of time.

Couriers compete (race) against each other for respect, credits, access to other topsites, and fun. Private couriers often operate as independent (iND) couriers. Some couriers band together to form courier groups which provide support and friendship through camaraderie. Although it may be noted that Couriers/Racers are looked down upon more than ever by affiliates and topsite staff with the increase of scripts that perform the couriers tasks automatically.

== See also ==
- List of warez groups
