= Apocalypse Production Crew =

Warez organization

- Formation: May 1997
- Dissolved: April 2004
- Purpose: mp3 warez
- Location: United States
- Founders: acid^rain and Viper

Apocalypse Production Crew (styled as aPOCALYPSE pRODUCTION cREW or aPC) was a major MP3 warez organization founded by two individuals known under the pseudonyms acid^rain and Viper in May 1997. aPC operated well into the mid-2000s and was subject to raid during Operation Fastlink—a coordination of four separate simultaneous undercover investigations by the FBI, the FBI Cyber Division, the U.S. Department of Justice, the Computer Crimes and Intellectual Property Section (CCIPS) of the Criminal Division and Interpol. aPC was known to many as the first organized group to put mp3s onto the internet. Their efforts predated the scene and started with composing MIDI versions of popular songs.

On August 21, 2003, Mark Shumaker (known by the pseudonym markalso), pleaded guilty to violating copyright laws and became the first federal criminal prosecution of someone who specialized in music piracy after having been raided in Operation Buccaneer. Shumaker was previously a leader of aPC, but at the time of the raid, he had retired his role. No members of aPC were raided as a part of Operation Buccaneer. They would five years later, however, be raided in Operation Fastlink which caused the disbanding of the group.

== See also ==
- Rabid Neurosis (RNS)
