= Operation Cyberstorm =

Undercover software piracy investigation by the FBI

Operation Cyberstorm was a two-year undercover operation in the United States led by the Federal Bureau of Investigation (FBI) targeting large-scale trafficking in counterfeit and infringing software. Conducted from 2000 to April 2002 in cooperation with the Internal Revenue Service, the United States Customs Service and local law-enforcement agencies in California, Oregon and Washington, it culminated in April 2002 with the arrest of 27 people and the execution of search warrants on homes and businesses in the San Francisco Bay Area.

Microsoft officials characterized the case as dismantling the largest criminal conspiracy in the history of the software industry, while later commentary described the crackdown as the largest anti-piracy sweep in the FBI's history at the time. The operation produced a series of prosecutions, including a high-profile case in which four defendants were convicted of defrauding Microsoft of more than US$29 million in discounted academic software.

== Background ==
During the late 1990s and early 2000s, software publishers and law-enforcement agencies reported a sharp rise in the production and distribution of high-quality counterfeit software, often involving organized crime groups and the misuse of genuine certificates of authenticity and other security features. California was identified as a major entry and assembly point for counterfeit software and components imported from Asia.

In response, the FBI and other federal agencies expanded investigations into intellectual-property crime and cooperated with local high-technology task forces such as the Rapid Enforcement Allied Computer Team (REACT) in Silicon Valley. Operation Cyberstorm developed out of these efforts as a multi-agency undercover case directed from the FBI's San Jose office, focusing on wholesale distributors and resellers of counterfeit Microsoft products on the West Coast of the United States.

== Investigation ==
According to court filings, the undercover phase of Operation Cyberstorm began in 2000, when an FBI agent posed as a businessman engaged in buying and selling computer software through a sham distribution company. The agent purchased counterfeit copies of Microsoft Windows 98, Microsoft Office 2000 and other products from suspected dealers at homes and parking lots around the Bay Area, typically paying between US$7 and US$70 per disc for items that retailed for US$200 to US$600.

== Convictions ==
Mirza Ali, 60, of Fremont, California and Sameena Ali, 53, also of Fremont, were sentenced in 2007 to 60 months imprisonment, and forfeiture in the amount of $5,105,977. Keith Griffen, 56, of Oregon City, Oregon, was sentenced to 33 months of imprisonment, restitution to Microsoft Corporation in the amount of $20,000,000, three years of supervised release, and $900 in special assessments. William Glushenko, 66, was sentenced to one year of probation and 100 hours of community service after pleading guilty to misprision of felony.

== See also ==
- Operation Buccaneer
- Operation Fastlink
- Cyber Storm Exercise
