= Superior Art Creations =

Underground group of computer art scene enthusiasts

Superior Art Creations (SAC)
- Formation: 1994
- Purpose: Artscene warez
- Location: Germany
- Founders: Roy (aka Carsten Cumbrowski) and Hetero (aka Sebastian)
- Products: SAC Scener Art Packs
- Website: SuperiorArtCreations.com

Superior Art Creations (SAC) is an underground artscene group which caters primarily to and is well known within the warez scene. SAC members have made, besides ANSI and ASCII art, VGA bitmap graphics, tracker music, and a variety of other works. SAC's character graphics have also been used in bottles and FTP servers.

== Origin and brief history ==
SAC originated as a German-based art group, founded in December 1994 by six members: Dream Design, Kaethe, Raiser, Toxic Trancer and the two artists Hetero and Roy, with Roy acting as the primary organizer of the group. The first SAC Art Pack was released the same month at "The Party" Demo Party in Herning, Denmark.

During the mid to late 1990s most of the notable ANSI artscene groups had distanced themselves from the warez scene, rather creating art for the sake of art, or for bulletin boards that were purely artscene related. Following this, SAC moved into this vacant territory and quickly became recognized as the leading group of warez scene artists. SAC was also able to establish credibility and respect from non-warez art groups and also demogroups of the broad and diverse computer art scene that was already established at the time.

== SAC organizational structure ==
From the very beginning SAC had a very loose group structure. Members worked mostly independently with little if any direction from the group leaders. Every member has the freedom to decide for himself which art requests he is willing to fulfill and which not. Seniority was achieved by being an active member for an extended period of time. Exceptions were made occasionally for outstanding contributions to the Group. New member applications were accepted or rejected by a simple majority vote of the existing members. It was never the decision of a single person (regardless of the status of that member). All new member applications and artwork samples were published in designated member-only areas at the SAC World Headquarter BBS "Closed Society" which was located in Berlin, Germany. The applications were also made available on the Internet at SAC's IRC Channel #SAC on the EFnet and SAC FTP Server HQ's.

=== The role of the leader ===
The role of the leader was primarily the task (which wasn't always simple) of collecting the new artwork produced by members and assembling the new SAC Art Pack, updating the group's NFO file and releasing the Pack. This was not a problem because the leader of SAC Roy/SAC was also the SysOp of the SAC World headquarter BBS called "Closed Society".

=== The job of the artists, musicians and coders ===
- SAC artists created and still create today ASCII & ANSI Text art (.NFO release info file logos, file_id.diz logos, BBS artwork) and VGA pixel art for other computer groups, BBS's (bulletin board systems) and FTP sites, websites and more.
- SAC musicians created "MOD" and later also MP3 music; just as a standalone piece of art or to be used in "Intros", Demo and other programs such as "Installers".
- SAC "coders" or programmers programmed BBS ads, Cracktros and Intros using most of the time graphics and music created by fellow SAC Members.

== SAC/PPE ==
For a brief period, SAC also had a PPE (PCBoard Programming Executable) section; this was eventually separated out from SAC and became the PPE Group "Peanuts" (Abbreviation: PNS).

PPE's are programs written in the proprietary PCBoard Script Language PPL (PCBoard Programming Language). They could only be used for PCBoard and no other BBS Software. PCBoard was very popular at the time and was used by over 90% of the warez BBS systems that were running on a PC. The introduction of PPL in PCBoard Version 15.0 boosted the popularity of the until then fairly unknown BBS software by Clark Development. Up to this time the PC (warez) scene did not have a powerful BBS software that could compete with the Amiga BBS software Ami-Express (Short: Ami-X or simply /X). Almost all warez BBS systems running on Amigas used /X. The PC adaptation of /X called PC Express saw a brief period of widespread use but was soon replaced by PCBoard 15.x.

All SAC PPE's and SAC Art Packs are available for download at the SAC founder's website. The official SAC website is currently under development.

== In the 21st century ==
Towards the late 1990s, a good majority of NFO file ASCII art was created by various members of SAC. In 1999, lead ASCII artist ferrex is a member of the senior staff and leadership in group.

In the early 2000s SAC was a global organization and employs approximately 40 artists and programmers. SAC members continued to create art for the warez scene.

The most recent artworks credited to SAC were released in 2009, as such the group is considered to be disbanded.

== Gallery of works ==
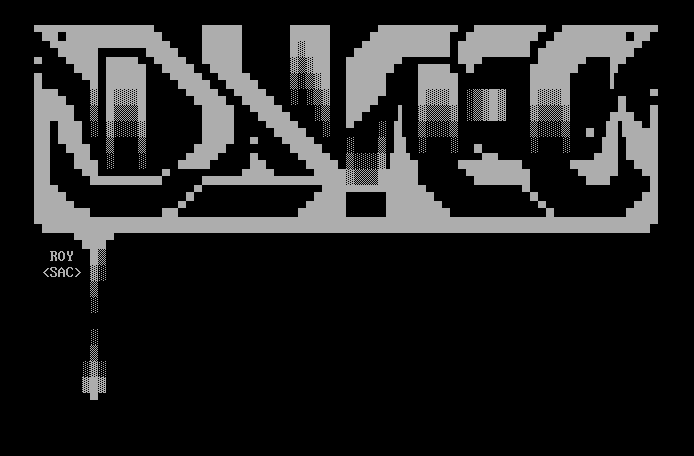
Dytec Ascii Logo by member artist Roy.

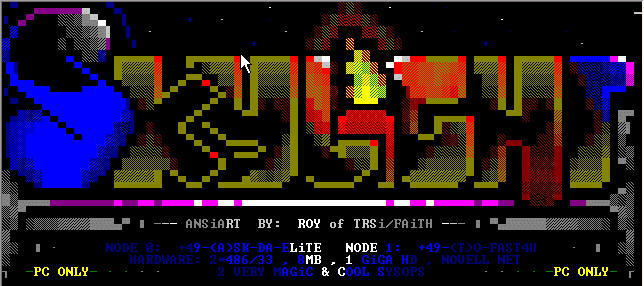
Skylight BBS Ansi by member artist Roy.

Energy VGA Logo by member artist Roy.
