= Tsearch =

Tsearch may mean:

- tsearch/tsearch2, the full-text search extension for PostgreSQL
- tsearch, the C programming language function for a binary search tree
- Tsearch, the memory scanner, debugger similar to Cheat Engine used for Cheating in video games
