= FairLight =

Swedish demo group

FairLight aka FLT
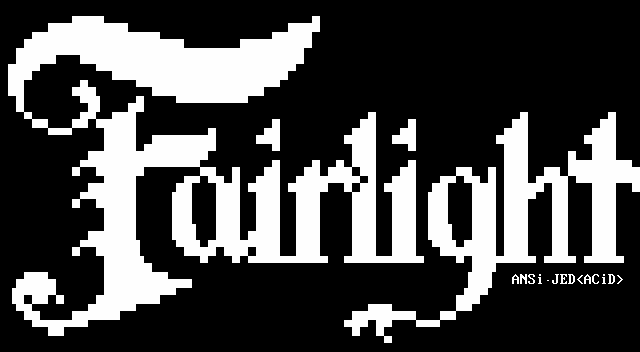
- FairLight logo by JED of ACiD.
- Formation: 1987
- Purpose: Warez and demo
- Location: Sweden
- Members: Strider, Black Shadow, Gollum, Bacchus, Pantaloon and others
- Founders: Strider and Black Shadow
- Website: http://www.fairlight.to/

FairLight (FLT) is a warez and demo group initially involved in the Commodore demoscene, and in cracking to illegally release games for free, since 1987. In addition to the C64, FairLight has also migrated towards the Amiga, Super NES and later the PC. FairLight was founded during the Easter holiday in 1987 by Strider and Black Shadow, both ex-members of West Coast Crackers (WCC). This "West Coast" was the west coast of Sweden, so FairLight was initially a Swedish group, which later became internationalized. The name was taken from the Fairlight CMI synthesizer which Strider saw Jean-Michel Jarre use on some of his records.

== Beginning ==
FairLight became known for their fast cracks. The secret was that Strider worked in a computer store where he got the latest games. He then bribed a train conductor to transport the games from Malmö to Ronneby where Gollum cracked the game and sent it back in the same way. That way they could get releases out faster than other groups.

== Operation Fastlink ==
Several high-ranking members of the group were caught on April 21, 2004, 8 months after the group returned from their temporary "retirement" that began on June 9, 2003 and ended on August 30, in an FBI operation called Operation Fastlink.

Police forces from eleven countries were involved, arresting about 120 people and seizing more than 200 computers (including 30 servers). One server from the U.S. raid contained 65,000 pirated titles which were alleged to be in the archive repository of the group.

The operation was coordinated by the FBI, the British National Hi-Tech Crime Unit, the German Bundeskriminalamt (BKA) and the Business Software Alliance, and took place in 27 U.S. states. In the UK, seven computers were seized and three arrests made in Belfast, Manchester and Sheffield. In Singapore, three people (22, 30 & 34 years old) were arrested. In the Netherlands two servers owned by students on 2 universities were investigated by police officers. Other arrests and seizures were made in Belgium, Denmark, France, Germany, Hungary, Israel, and Sweden for a total of 11 countries.

According to rumor, the raid occurred just before the warez group would have released the game Hitman: Contracts. The game was released by other groups (iNSOMNiA, for Xbox and PS2, and Razor 1911, for PCs) a few days later.

Shortly after the Operation Fastlink raids, council member [Bacchus] writes:

Protections of today are ones that *very* few can penetrate and those who do, should be worthy the respect. Downloading them fast is just a matter of a fast line in combination to access to a site. Skills stay, whereas the access can be revoked instantly!

The last massive warez-related raid prior to Fastlink was Operation Buccaneer which targeted DrinkOrDie (amongst others) in December 2001.

== Game ISO ==
Since October 2006 the ISO division of FairLight has started releasing again. Their PC game ISO division started in late 1998 and by 2011, it was the first group to reach 1000 game ISO releases.

== Records ==
FairLight had a short-lived collaboration with TRSI with their cooperative endeavor TRSi and Fairlight Recordz, formed by member Zinkfloid (also known as Uyanik) and Raven from FairLight. The groups released several albums under their brand name "TRSI & FairLight Recordz", including Muffler (2000) and CNCD (1995).

== Later lives ==
As of 2012, Magnus "Pantaloon" Sjöberg works as lead software engineer at Digital Illusions. Pontus "Bacchus" Berg works in telecom. Fredrik "Gollum" Kahl is now professor in mathematics at Lund University. Per "Zike" Carlbring is a professor in clinical psychology at Stockholm University. Tony "Strider" Krvaric emigrated to the United States in 1992 and is chairman emeritus of the Republican Party of San Diego County. Krvaric later received criticism for an old screen recording on YouTube where he is allegedly shown alongside other Fairlight members in an Amiga demo containing swastikas and Nazi imagery; he denied any association with far-right groups and dismissed the video as part of an "internal GOP smear campaign".

== See also ==
- United Software Association — IBM PC-warez organization which released cooperatively with FairLight during the early 1990s.
- List of warez groups
