= Rabid Neurosis =

Former warez release group

- Former ASCII Art Logo from an nfo
- Formation: 1996
- Dissolved: 2007
- Purpose: mp3 warez
- Location: Worldwide
- Founders: BonethuG & N0fX

Rabid Neurosis (RNS) was an MP3 warez release organization which was founded in 1996, following in the footsteps of Compress 'Da Audio (CDA), the first MP3 piracy group. In 1999, the group claimed to have released over 6,000 titles a year. Over the 11 years it operated, RNS leaked over 20,000 albums according to the RIAA’s database, an FBI investigation, and the group’s own records. RNS occasionally used the tagline "Rabid Neurosis - Spread The Epidemic." RNS were best known for releasing highly anticipated albums by hip hop, pop, rock and dance artists weeks and sometimes months before their official release date. RNS is known to have greatly contributed to the mp3 scene. After their group was mentioned in an MTV News article about the early leak of the Eminem album Encore, RNS stopped including their initials in filenames and ID3 tags.

Their last release was Fall Out Boy's Infinity on High on January 19, 2007.

On September 9, 2009, four members of the defunct group were indicted by the United States Department of Justice for conspiracy to commit copyright infringement. They included Adil R. Cassim (who used the handle 'Kali' and later 'Blazini'), Matthew D. Chow ('rl'), Bennie L. Glover ('adeg') and Edward L. Mohan II ('MistaEd'). Adil Cassim took over leadership of the group in 2000 after the departure of the former leader 'Al_Capone', and had previously been a member of other mp3 warez groups HNA and RPB before they merged with RNS.

On March 19, 2010, Matthew Chow, identified as a member of the group, was found not guilty of conspiracy to commit criminal infringement. Federal authorities charged Chow with a single count of conspiracy to commit copyright infringement, which carries a maximum sentence of five years in prison and a $250,000 fine. Of the five other members of RNS, Adil Cassim of California was also found not guilty. Four other RNS members pleaded guilty to copyright infringement.

== See also ==
- How Music Got Free
- Warez scene
- Warez group
- Topsite (warez)
- Standard (warez)
