= Risciso =

Former warez group

RiSCiSO
- Formation: 1993
- Dissolved: 2005
- Purpose: Warez

Risciso (/rɪsk aɪ ɛs oʊ/ or /ˌrɪsk ˈaɪsoʊ/, also styled RiSCiSO) was an online warez group, founded in approximately 1993, dedicated to distributing newly released copyrighted software, games and movies. The acronym "RISC" stood for Rise in Superior Couriering, and "ISO" referred to a file format commonly used for the storage and transfer of disc images although the group RISC and RiSCiSO were two completely separate groups. The organization operated until the Operation Site Down raids in the summer of 2005. American authorities are still searching for the organization's ring leader Sean Patrick O'Toole, after he failed to appear in an American court in February 2006. He placed a call to his friend and group leader Sandy Fury, wishing her a happy birthday and an apology and then disappeared at Heathrow Airport.

In all, a total of 19 individuals have been charged with a 15-count indictment brought by the U.S. Attorney's Office under Patrick Fitzgerald in U.S. District Court in Chicago. The lead prosecutor for the Government in this case was Assistant U.S. Attorney Pravin Rao.

As of May 2013, Sean O'Toole has not been apprehended, and the statute of limitations has passed. Linda Waldron remains a fugitive in her home in Barbados. In 2008, The executive editor of Wiley & Sons, publishers of Kevin Mitnick and Bruce Schneier books, were in talks with Fury about a publishing deal but another book on Piracy was released around that time and all plans stalled.

An FBI report released in 2011 showed that the materials available for download on one of Risciso's servers exceeded $6.5 million.

== See also ==
- Operation Site Down
- RISCISO Indictments
