= DrinkOrDie =

Software piracy organization

- DrinkOrDie ASCII .nfo header. Their slogan reads "warez bearz from Russia and beyond".
- Formation: 1993; 33 years ago
- Dissolved: 2001
- Purpose: Warez
- Location: Russia
- Origin: Moscow
- Founders: deviator CyberAngel; Jimmy Jamez
- Website: www.drinkordie.com

DrinkOrDie (DoD) was one of the most prestigious underground software piracy group and warez trading network during the 1990s. On 11 December 2001 a major law enforcement raid - known as Operation Buccaneer - forced it to close under criminal charges of infringement. DoD, as a rule, received no financial profit for their activities. The DoD network - which primarily consisted of university undergraduates - was also supported by software company employees, who leaked copies of software and other digital media. DoD was also actively involved in illicit file-trading with other networks.

== History ==
=== Start up and trading ===
DrinkOrDie was founded in 1993 in Moscow by a Russian with the handle "deviator" aka "Jimmy Jamez" and a friend who went by the code name "CyberAngel." By 1995, the group was global with Jimmy Jamez as leader. In the following years, the group's founders stepped aside and were replaced by multiple council members of different nationalities. By the end of the millennium, DrinkOrDie had leaders and council members from the United States, Australia and Israel.

One of its earliest major accomplishments was the Internet release of Windows 95 two weeks before Microsoft released the official version. It is also known for its DoD DVD Speed Ripper released in 1999 shortly before DeCSS. DrinkOrDie was the biggest and most important software related group in the PC demo scene until 2001's Operation Buccaneer.

=== Member raids ===
In 2001 the group was busted in a U.S. Customs operation called Operation Buccaneer. The global raids were initiated after information was given to United States Customs by James Cudney, known as Bcrea8tiv. Cudney quickly rose up the ranks of DOD council where he spent many years working undercover for US Customs, logging conversations in chat rooms and channels visited on IRC. He also carried out undercover operations in the UK, France, and the US prior to the arrests collecting detailed information on DOD members and members of other online warez groups. e.g., screenames, ftp locations, nationalities. At the time, DrinkOrDie allegedly had two leaders, one in the United States and another in Australia. The warez scene reacted surprised to the bust because the Windows 95 leak was their last major release since 1995.

==== Australia ====
Co-leader Hew Raymond Griffiths, known by his handle "Bandido", was a British national and long-term Australian resident from Bateau Bay on the Central Coast of New South Wales. He was charged in 2003 with copyright infringement and conspiracy to commit copyright infringement under US legislation. He fought extradition to the US for over 3 years, and was arbitrarily detained by Australia for most of that time.

Griffiths was ultimately unsuccessful and in early February 2007, he was extradited to the US. He pleaded guilty on 20 April 2007 to one count of conspiracy to commit criminal copyright infringement and one count of criminal copyright infringement. On 22 June 2007 Griffiths was sentenced to 51 months in prison for conspiracy to commit copyright infringement. But the US District Court Judge, Claude M Hilton, took into account the almost three years Griffiths had spent in Australian jails while fighting extradition, meaning he only served 15 months in a US jail.

==== UK ====
As a result of Operation Buccaneer, the UK's National Hi-Tech Crime Unit also arrested 6 members living in Britain. Four of them ran a 9-month trial starting in September 2004 at the Central Criminal Court - Old Bailey and were convicted for Conspiracy to Defraud Software Companies and Institutions. Sentences for those convicted ranged from house arrest to 30 months in prison.

==== Elsewhere ====
Apart from Griffiths and the British defendants, others implicated in DoD were Swedish, German, Norwegian, Italian and Finnish nationals. All except Griffiths were dealt with under the copyright or fraud laws of their own country. Griffiths was the only member of the international network to be extradited to the US. This has set an important benchmark in copyright enforcement for the US Department of Justice.

== Activity ==
US prosecutors allege that DrinkorDie released more than 275 application and utility programs from November 2000 to December 2001, worth more than US$1 million at the time. One of their leech sites grew to 1 terabyte, with more than 15,000 titles.
