= Sega Smash Pack =

Video game compilations

- Developers: Sega; CodeFire (GBA)
- Publisher: Sega: NA: THQ (GBA)
- Platforms: Microsoft Windows, Dreamcast, Game Boy Advance
- Release: Microsoft Windows; February 18, 1999 (Pack 1); April 1, 1999 (Pack 2); November 14, 2000 (Pack 3); Dreamcast: NA: January 30, 2001; Game Boy Advance: NA: September 23, 2002; EU: August 1, 2003
- Genre: Various
- Modes: Single-player, multiplayer

Sega Smash Pack (Sega Archives from USA in Japan) is a series of video game compilations developed and published by Sega. Released for Microsoft Windows, Dreamcast, and Game Boy Advance between 1999 and 2002, the collections primarily feature games originally released for the Sega Genesis.

== Pack 1 (Windows) ==
The first pack titled Sega Smash Pack (Sega Archives from USA Vol. 1 in Japan) featured eight games.

- Altered Beast (1988)
- Columns (1990)
- Golden Axe (1989)
- Out Run (1986)
- Phantasy Star II (1989)
- The Revenge of Shinobi (1989)
- Sonic the Hedgehog Spinball (1993)
- Vectorman (1995)

== Pack 2 (Windows) ==
The second pack titled Sega Puzzle Pack (Sega Archives from USA Vol. 2 in Japan) featured three games.

- Columns III: Revenge of Columns (1993)
- Dr. Robotnik's Mean Bean Machine (1993)
- Lose Your Marbles (1997)

== Pack 3 (Windows) ==
The third pack titled Sega Smash Pack 2 (Sega Archives from USA Vol. 3 in Japan) featured eight games.

- Comix Zone (1995)
- Flicky (1991)
- Kid Chameleon (1992)
- Shining Force (1992)
- Sonic the Hedgehog 2 (1992)
- Super Hang-On (1989)
- Vectorman 2 (1996)
- Sega Swirl (1999) (as a separate executable program)

== Console (Dreamcast) ==
The console version of Sega Smash Pack was released for Dreamcast titled Sega Smash Pack Volume 1 and featured the following twelve games:

- Altered Beast (1988)
- Columns (1990)
- Golden Axe (1989)
- Phantasy Star II (1989)
- The Revenge of Shinobi (1989)
- Sega Swirl (1999)
- Shining Force (1992)
- Sonic the Hedgehog (1991)
- Streets of Rage 2 (1992)
- Vectorman (1995)
- Virtua Cop 2 (1995)
- Wrestle War (1991)

Jeff Gerstmann from GameSpot gave the console version a 4.5/10. He criticised the console version for its patchy performance and poorly emulated music.

The Genesis emulator built inside the compilation gained popularity with homebrew groups, as Echelon released a kit that allowed users to add and load their own Genesis ROMs. The programmer, Gary Lake, deliberately left documentation for the built-in emulator with the documentation seemingly intended at them due to the filename (ECHELON.TXT). Additionally, Sega Swirl and Virtua Cop 2 were the only non-Genesis games in the compilation.

== Handheld (Game Boy Advance) ==
The handheld version of Sega Smash Pack was released for Game Boy Advance simply titled Sega Smash Pack and featured three games, two of which had been included in the first Smash Pack. While Ecco the Dolphin and Sonic Spinball were developed using the original source code, Golden Axe had to be recreated from scratch.

- Ecco the Dolphin (1992)
- Golden Axe (1989)
- Sonic the Hedgehog Spinball (1993)

Craig Harris from IGN gave the handheld version a 6/10. He criticised the handheld version for several technical issues and lack of cooperative multiplayer in Golden Axe. It was nominated for GameSpot's annual "Most Disappointing Game on Game Boy Advance" award, which went to The Revenge of Shinobi.
