= Wrestle War (video game) =

1989 video game

- Box art
- Developer: Sega
- Publisher: Sega
- Platforms: Arcade, Sega Mega Drive
- Release: Arcade; 1989; Mega Drive: JP: June 28, 1991; PAL: November 18, 1991
- Genres: Sports-based fighting
- Modes: Single-player, multiplayer

Wrestle War is a video game developed and published by Sega which was released in arcades in 1989, and later ported to the Sega Mega Drive console in 1991 in Japan, Australia, and Europe. Despite being released the same year as World Championship Wrestling's WrestleWar pay-per-view event, it is not associated with any wrestling promotion. The original Japanese game cover featured a Hulk Hogan look-alike, but this was changed for the international release.

The Mega Drive version of Wrestle War was included as part of the Sega Smash Pack compilation for the Dreamcast in 2001. In 2022, the original arcade version was included as part of the Sega Astro City Mini V, a vertically-oriented variant of the Sega Astro City mini console.

== Gameplay and roster ==
The player takes control of Bruce Blade, a rookie wrestler, through a series of matches to win the SWA (SEGA Wrestling Alliance) World Heavyweight Championship belt by facing the following wrestlers, each possessing their own unique wrestling moves:

- Mohawk Kid
- Sledge Hammer (based on Bruiser Brody)
- Mr. J (based on Jason Voorhees from the Friday the 13th movie series and the real-life wrestler, Jason the Terrible)
- Don Dambuster (based on Road Warrior Hawk)
- Mad Dog/Nim Rod Falcon (based on Lucha libre star Mil Máscaras)
- Titan Morgan (based on Hulk Hogan)
- Buckskin Rogers (based on Stan Hansen)
- Grand Kong (based on Abdullah the Butcher)

== Reception ==
Reception

Review score
Publication	Score
Mega	38%

In Japan, Game Machine listed Wrestle War on their April 1, 1989 issue as being the second most-successful table arcade unit of the month.
