= Operation D-Elite =

Federal operation against torrent tracker site

- The EliteTorrents website was replaced with this notice

Participants
- Planned by: U.S. Federal Bureau of Investigation, U.S. Immigration and Customs Enforcement
- Countries participating: United States, Netherlands
- No. of countries participating: 2

Mission
- Target: leading members of EliteTorrents

Timeline
- Date executed: May 25, 2005

Results
- Suspects: 10
- Arrests: 3
- Miscellaneous results: Seized through fines: $21,000

Operation D-Elite was an operation by agents of the United States' Federal Bureau of Investigation and Immigration and Customs Enforcement agency against leading members of EliteTorrents, a BitTorrent tracker site, resulting in five months of prison, five months of home arrest, and a $3,000 fine against Grant T. Stanley on October 17, 2006. Another administrator of the site, Scott McCausland, received the same sentence on December 19, 2006.

== Prelude ==
EliteTorrents was singled out among the large number of Bittorrent sites because EliteTorrents released a Star Wars: Episode III – Revenge of the Sith workprint approximately six hours prior to the movie's theatrical release. This attracted the attention of the MPAA, which monitors BitTorrent sites. The MPAA began collecting information and pressuring the Federal Bureau of Investigation to take some form of action.

In addition to the Star Wars workprint, the owner of the EliteTorrents domain name lived in the United States, which made the site an easier target for U.S. authorities. However, the site's server was located in the Netherlands, and the other BitTorrent trackers located on that server continued to operate.

When the site was first taken down, people who tried to access it were confronted by a notice, apparently created in Microsoft Word, which led the owners to announce that the site had been a victim of a DDoS attack or some other type of hoax. However, in the early hours of May 25, the United States Department of Justice and FBI announced that they had taken down the website.

== People charged ==
Grant T. Stanley
Five months of jail time, five months of home arrest, and a $3,000 fine was leveled on October 17, 2006.
Scott McCausland
Five months of jail time, five months of home arrest, and a $3,000 fine was leveled on October 17, 2006.
An Duc Do
Known online as "R313007", was a Drexel University graduate. In 2005, he was arrested in connection with uploading Star Wars Episode III as part of Operation D-Elite Faced with the steep jail term An Duc Do plead guilty to conspiracy and copyright infringement. While Duc Do shared movies like Harry Potter and the Prisoner of Azkaban, The Flight of the Phoenix, and King Arthur from a computer server where 133,000 users had access to it, he was not a high user. Floyd Miller, the prosecutor for the U.S. Attorney's Office in Philadelphia where Duc Do was charged said, "They [other Elite Torrent members] threatened to kick him out of the organization because he wasn't uploading as much as some of the other pirates were doing," As part of the guilty plea he was sentenced to three years' probation, a $15,000 fine and 400 hours' of community service.

== See also ==
- Operation Buccaneer
- Operation Fastlink
- Operation Site Down
