= List of warez groups =

Warez groups are teams of individuals who have participated in the organized unauthorized publication of films, music, or other media, as well as those who can reverse engineer and crack the digital rights management (DRM) measures applied to commercial software. This is a list of groups, both web-based and warez scene groups, which have attained notoriety outside of their respective communities. A plurality of warez groups operate within the so-called warez scene, though as of 2019 a large amount of software and game warez is now distributed first via the web. Leaks of releases from warez groups operating within the "scene" still constitute a large amount of warez shared globally. Between 2003 and 2009 there were 3,164 active groups within the warez scene, with the majority of these groups being active for no more than two months and with only a small fraction being active for many years. The warez scene is a very competitive and volatile environment, largely a symptom of participation in its community being illegal in most countries. Groups are generally not driven by profit, but by reputation.

== Groups ==
=== 3DM ===
3DM is a Chinese video game cracking group. Their founder and leader is reported to be Su Feifei, more commonly known by the pseudonym "Bird Sister" (Chinese: 不死鸟; pinyin: bù sǐ niǎo; lit. 'Phoenix'). Little else is known about Su, other than that her year of birth is speculated to be 1979. Unusual for piracy groups, 3DM's members have public profiles on the social network Sina Weibo, and use a blog to inform the public about their activities. Some members of 3DM have previously been part of NETSHOW (now known as ALI213), a group which released Chinese language copies of games using stolen cracks directly to warez scene FTP sites.

3DM were one of the first peer to peer file sharing groups to offer cracks for games which utilized DRM produced by Denuvo. As newer versions of Denuvo DRM became more challenging to reverse engineer, 3DM gave up trying to crack games with Denuvo DRM.

In 2016 the group claimed that piracy of games produced by large developers and publishers would be impossible in the coming years, due to the technological challenges of reverse engineering and ultimately cracking the virtualization and licensing schemes employed by new DRM solutions like Denuvo. One of the most notable groups on the web at the time, 3DM publicly announced a year hiatus from developing cracks for games. Since returning in 2017, 3DM have only released games which use Steam licensing, only releasing copies of better protected games which include cracks made by other groups. This practice has been criticized by the groups whose cracks were included in releases under the 3DM name.

=== CLASS ===
CLASS (also known as CLS) was a warez group which was the target of federal raids such as Operation Fastlink. They were a global group with members worldwide, often releasing game "rips". The group ceased operations in 2004 after their 1,234th release.

=== CODEX ===
CODEX (also known as CDX) – was a warez group founded at the end of February 2014. They were known for releasing copies of games which used Steam licensing and also for emulating Ubisoft's Uplay digital rights management protection. They were accused by the warez group SKIDROW of stealing their code to crack Trials Fusion, something CODEX denied, stating that they had written their own code for the DRM emulation. From 2016 to 2020 they have been one of the most active warez groups releasing commercial computer games with over 3700 releases in less than 6 years, compared to older groups like SKIDROW having fewer than 2500 over more than a decade of activity.

In late 2017 CODEX gained notoriety by becoming the third scene group (and fifth overall entity) to crack Denuvo DRM when they released a cracked version of Middle-earth: Shadow of War on its release date. CODEX collaborated with STEAMPUNKS on at least one game which used Denuvo DRM, South Park: The Fractured but Whole, which they released under the name "CODEPUNKS". In February 2018 CODEX began releasing cracked copies of games from the Microsoft Windows Store. In mid-2018 CODEX began releasing cracked copies of games featuring the latest versions of Denuvo DRM, including updated versions of Assassin's Creed Origins and Far Cry 5, both of which used Uplay licensing DRM and contained additional anti-modification and anti-debugging code through the use of VMProtect. On February 1, 2019, CODEX published a cracked copy of Resident Evil 2, which used Denuvo DRM, 7 days after the worldwide commercial release of the game. In late June 2019, CODEX released two cracked copies of games which utilized Denuvo DRM, Shadow of the Tomb Raider and a cracked updated version of Metal Gear Solid V: The Phantom Pain.

These cracks were previously released on the web attributed to the Russian cracker "Empress". Later, a cracker who self-identified as C0000005 began releasing cracks under the name Empress as well, suggesting that they are one and the same and that C0000005 had access to source code for CODEX's cracks. On June 27, 2019 CODEX released a crack for Star Wars Battlefront 2, about 527 days after its commercial release. On October 29, 2019 they published a cracked copy of Borderlands 3, another game distributed with Denuvo DRM, 46 days after release.

In late 2019, a crack developed by CODEX for Need for Speed: Heat, which uses Denuvo DRM, was leaked online, likely through their network of testers. Normally, the final cracks published by CODEX made use of anti-debugging tools like VMProtect or Themida, to impede reverse engineering efforts. This unfinished crack was not similarly protected. Subsequently, CODEX did not release any cracks for games using Denuvo DRM until June 2020, when they released cracked copies of Team Sonic Racing, Trials of Mana, The Quiet Man, and an updated version of Far Cry: New Dawn.

On February 23, 2022, CODEX announced its retirement in its cracked release of The Sims 4: My Wedding Stories. The group cited the lack of competition in the cracking scene as a sign that CODEX had accomplished its founding goal in 2014, which was to compete with RELOADED, "the dominating PC games group at the time."

=== CONSPIR4CY ===
CONSPIR4CY (releasing mostly as CPY) is a warez group founded in 1999 in Italy. They rose in notoriety after releasing Rise of the Tomb Raider and Inside in August 2016 under the name of CONSPIR4CY, though they resumed using the 'CPY' tag shortly thereafter with the release of their cracked copy of Doom in September 2016. They became the first group to create proper cracks for games protected by the third iteration of Denuvo DRM software.

They cracked Resident Evil 7: Biohazard only five days after its release, at the time the shortest amount of time taken to develop a crack for a Denuvo DRM-protected game. They also cracked Mass Effect: Andromeda, only ten days after its release. In July 2017 the warez group SKIDROW criticized the methods used by CONSPIR4CY to crack games using Denuvo DRM. In early 2018, CPY released cracked copies of Assassin's Creed Origins and Far Cry 5, which were compiled with the most recent version of Denuvo DRM, and had additional anti-modification and anti-debugging features through the use of VMProtect software and EasyAntiCheat. In November 2018 CPY released cracks for HITMAN 2, Assassin's Creed Odyssey, A Way Out, Shadow of the Tomb Raider, Pro Evolution Soccer 2019, FIFA 19 - all of which featured the latest version of Denuvo DRM, with some using additional custom DRM or off the shelf DRM such as EACore and VMProtect. In December 2018, CPY published a cracked copy of Just Cause 4, which used the latest version of Denuvo DRM, on the day after its release. They also released a crack for Battlefield V on December 22, days after its official release. In January 2019, CPY released cracked copies of Ace Combat 7, Mutant Year Zero, and Strange Brigade, as well as the first episode of Life Is Strange 2 (titled "Roads") - all 4 titles using the latest versions of Denuvo DRM.

In February 2019, CPY released Metro Exodus, which used the latest version of Denuvo DRM available, within 5 days of its release, as well as the second episode of Life Is Strange 2, titled "Rules". In September 2019, CPY published a cracked copy of the game Octopath Traveler, 93 days after its release. In November 2019, CPY released a cracked copy of Heavy Rain which featured the latest version of Denuvo DRM. After a long hiatus, CPY became active again in October 2020, releasing cracked copies of eFootball PES 2021, A Total War Saga: Troy, Mafia: Definitive Edition and Death Stranding in a single day, all of which featured the latest version of Denuvo DRM. On October 18, CPY released Marvel's Avengers, followed by Crysis Remastered on October 21, which both used Denuvo DRM.

=== DEViANCE ===
One of the most prolific warez groups active from 1998 to 2006. Their dissolution has been described as the end of an era, and the current affiliation of ex-DEViANCE members is a reoccurring argument between groups. Describing members of a modern warez group as ex-DEViANCE became something of a joke within the warez scene.

=== DrinkOrDie ===
DrinkOrDie (also known as DoD) members were targeted by law enforcement in raids stemming from Operation Buccaneer. DOD was considered the most famous Software Piracy group in the warez group history, formed in Russia in the early 90s, and was known for its diverse leadership and influence, combined with members from Europe, the USA, Australia, and Israel.

=== Echelon ===
Echelon was a warez group which specialized in the release and distribution of console games, such as Dreamcast ISOs.

=== EViLiSO ===
Released American Pie on the Internet 3 months before its theatrical release. They branded their releases with a digital watermark of the letter "Z" which appeared in the corner of the frame. The bootleggers were associated with a web site in Argentina devoted to Quake.

=== EVO ===
EVO (short for EVOLUTiON), is a Portuguese release group mostly known for releasing leaked screeners of films before their official release. In an email interview with TorrentFreak, the group stated that they were motivated by "fun" rather than profit, and blamed movie studios for driving piracy by not making media more accessible to consumers. Movie industry insiders viewed EVO as a major threat. In 2021 EVO released a high quality copy of the blockbuster Dune before its official U.S. release in theaters and on HBO Max. The Netflix movies The Power of the Dog and The Guilty leaked before their official premiere from what appears to be film festival screeners, not from a typical award screener sent out to critics and awards voters. In 2022 an early Blu-ray copy of Spider-Man: No Way Home leaked online weeks before the official physical release, but in November that year the group stopped releasing new titles. This was highly unusual as they previously uploaded over a dozen titles each week. ACE boss Jan van Voorn informed TorrentFreak that several people connected to EVO were tracked down by the Alliance for Creativity and Entertainment. That year, no notable screeners leaked for the first time in over two decades.

=== FAiRLiGHT ===
FAiRLiGHT (releasing cracked games as FLT) is one of the oldest groups in warez scene, founded in 1987. As of 2017 the group seemingly focuses on demos and art, with their most recent release of cracked software in December 2016. FAiRLiGHT members were apprehended in raids stemming from the law enforcement Operation Fastlink. As of May 2021, a group using the name FLT has been actively releasing games using Steam DRM. Notable releases are: Days Gone, Guilty Gear Strive, and Mass Effect™ Legendary Edition among many others. It is believed they are the same people behind the groups HOODLUM, DOGE and VACE.

=== Hoodlum ===
Hoodlum (also known as HLM) mainly focused on cracking games which utilized digital rights management solutions offered by Safedisc and Securom. They were targeted as part of the Operation Site Down raids in 2005. In July 2018, some group using the HOODLUM name resumed releasing unauthorized copies of games.

=== The Humble Guys ===
The Humble Guys (also known as THG) were the first warez group to make use of NFO files to document their releases.

=== HATRED ===
Founded in late 2006, HATRED was very active during 2006 to 2007. ViTALiTY has claimed that HATRED were former members of DEViANCE. Some of their major releases included Rainbow Six: Vegas and Resident Evil 4. Their last release was in August 2008.

=== HYBRID ===
HYBRID (also known as HBD) was founded in 1993. HYBRID later split up when the US-members founded DYNAMIX (later PRESTIGE and PARADIGM).

=== International Network of Crackers ===
International Network of Crackers (also known as INC) was one of the premier cracking/releasing warez groups for the IBM PC during the late 1980s and early 1990s. The majority of their releases during 1993 were educational games for children. By early 1994, INC had completely disappeared from the warez scene.

=== Kalisto ===
Kalisto is a console warez group established in March 1998 which specializes in the release and distribution of PlayStation and PlayStation 2 ISO images, briefly moonlighting on the Dreamcast platform in mid-to-late 2000.

=== maVen ===
maVen was a film release group from October 2005 until the summer of 2006. Releases from maVen stopped when the FBI caught Gérémi Adam, one of its key members. The 27-year-old Montreal resident has been sentenced to two and a half months in prison and was also ordered to complete 100 hours of community service. He pleaded guilty to distributing two major motion pictures: Invincible and How to Eat Fried Worms. After the bust, releases ceased until another group called maVenssupplieR immediately took up the slack. In April 2010, the 28-year-old Gérémi Adam died of a drug overdose at the Pointe-aux-Trembles home he shared with his girlfriend, Cynthia Laporte.

mVs (Maven Supplier) released a workprint of Halloween three days before its official release on August 27, 2007.

=== Myth ===
Myth was a warez group, focused on cracking and ripping PC games. Besides ripped games, the group also released trainers and cracked updates for games.

=== PARADOX ===
PARADOX (also known as PDX and sometimes PARADiSO) was founded in 1989, mainly cracking games for the Amiga. They went on to crack software for the Windows operating system and other consoles. They were one of the earliest groups to successfully crack Windows Vista, which was supposed to be a difficult task based on changes Microsoft had made to the activation scheme for the software.

PARADOX attracted attention from 2011 to 2012, as they published files for playing unauthorized copies of games on the Sony PlayStation 3. These copies required the use of a commercially available USB dongle, which has been criticized as a form of commercial copyright infringement, and described as a "ReDRM" dongle because copies of game binaries were essentially decrypted using Sony's official keys, and then re-encrypted using the keys stored on the dongle, requiring the use of the dongle to bypass the DRM which had been added back to the games. It is unclear whether groups like PARADOX had any affiliation with the creators and distributors of so-called "ReDRM" dongles, including potentially having profited from the release of these dongles by drumming up demand by releasing copies of games which only worked when used with the dongle.

PARADOX is well known for developing a utility known as "Preee", which automates the creation of NFO files and the packaging of warez releases into multi-part RAR archives and subsequent creation of ZIP archives containing those RAR files depending on the warez scene rules being followed.

In July 2020, after 3 years of inactivity, someone published a cracked copy of Monster Hunter: World, a game utilizing Denuvo DRM, with its Iceborn DLC using the name and NFO template of the group PARADOX.

=== Phrozen Crew ===
Phrozen Crew (PC) was one of the most popular groups of computer software crackers, utilizing the tagline "We always get what we want!" .

=== Pirates With Attitudes ===
The Pirates With Attitudes (also known as PWA) were a major international warez release group from 1992 until 2000. The group was formed by two former INC members known by the pseudonyms Orion and Bar Manager. PWA members were the subjects of law enforcement raids after the passing of the No Electronic Theft or "NET" Act.

=== Project X ===
Project X exclusively released games for the Xbox. In 2004, Project X was named as one of six groups targeted as part of Operation Fastlink by the United States Department of Justice.

=== Rabid Neurosis ===
Rabid Neurosis (RNS) was an MP3 warez release organization which was founded on June 6, 1996.

=== Radium ===
Several verses of the rap song Hackers and the Crackers by Zearle are devoted to the group Radium. In 2004, evidence was presented that some of the system sound files included with the Microsoft Windows XP operating system, such as WMPAUD1.WAV, were authored using an unlicensed version of Sound Forge which was supplied by Radium.

=== Razor 1911 ===
Razor 1911 (also known as RZR and RazorDOX) was founded in 1985 in Norway. Its primary bulletin board system was based in Norway. The group's main focus was to crack software for the Commodore 64 personal computer, but they also released Amiga and the IBM PC software. They were subjects of raids in Operation Buccaneer and Operation Fastlink.

The group made a comeback in June 2006, and since then has cracked modern copy protection schemes such as Rockstar Games Social Club, Ubisoft's persistent Internet connection requiring DRM, and Battle.NET. In March 2012, Razor1911 announced that their tester and coder DYCUS, who had an active role in making trainers and testing the group's releases, had died of cancer. Since then, the group has seldom released cracked games, focusing on DRM-free titles from GOG.com, as well as games for Linux and macOS.

=== RELOADED ===
RELOADED (also known as RLD!) was founded in June 2004. Their founders are believed to be ex-DEViANCE members, though their rival group HOODLUM claimed in December 2004 that none of DEViANCE's previous leaders had ever been part of RELOADED. The group has cracked several modern protection schemes like SecuROM 8, Blizzard's Battle.NET, and Arxan Anti-Tamper. In 2022 the group was reported as still active and working with team BTCR.

=== REVOLT ===
REVOLT gained popularity for creating solutions for cracked games to have working multiplayer features, and later for cracks of games using Denuvo DRM which were released by its founder. REVOLT was founded by a Bulgarian teenager, who used the online handle Voksi. In July 2018 the REVOLT website began redirecting to the website of the Bulgarian Ministry of the Interior. The same month, Voksi, then in his twenties, reported having been raided by Bulgarian law enforcement in response to a complaint filed by Denuvo parent company Irdeto. In comments made to media organisation TorrentFreak, Voksi alleged that "five or six officers, including two from Bulgaria's General Directorate for Combatting Organized Crime (GDBOB) and others from a local police station" entered his home and seized personal computing equipment.

=== Risciso ===
Risciso (stylized as RISCISO) was an online warez group, founded in approximately 1993, dedicated to distributing newly released copyrighted software, games and movies. Risciso was founded as a co-group of RiSC (Rise in Superior Couriering), which was the most famous trading group in the BBS era and the beginning of the file sharing era on the internet.

=== SKIDROW ===
SKIDROW is a well-known cracking group originally formed in 1990, cracking games for the Amiga platform, and having used the motto "Twice the Fun - Double the Trouble!" since then. A piece of cracktro software released by SKIDROW in 1992 with the game Pinball Fantasies contained a complete list of their membership at the time. The most recent incarnation of SKIDROW began releasing unauthorized copies of games in June 2007, when they announced their return to cracking software. They were the first scene group to crack the version of Ubisoft's Uplay DRM which required players to have a persistent Internet connection to Ubisoft's licensing servers, first in Assassin's Creed II and then in Prince of Persia: The Forgotten Sands.

The group has released cracks for Denuvo Anti-Tamper protected games, Yesterday Origins and Deus Ex: Mankind Divided - A Criminal Past. It is believed the former had a bad implementation of Denuvo which made it easier to reverse engineer, mostly due to a lack of support from Denuvo for protecting games written in C# and specifically games using the Unity game engine, with this lack of support having been previously demonstrated by an anonymous independent cracker having developed a crack for Syberia 3, which also used Unity. The crack for the latter was actually determined to be a modified executable file from the game Deus Ex: Breach, a free game which did not incorporate Denuvo's software, released by the same developers and utilizing the same engine, which had been modified slightly to load the assets from Deus Ex: Mankind Divided. A plurality of SKIDROW's current releases are cracked versions of games that make use of Steam licensing.

In July 2017, in a statement released to commemorate their 10th consecutive year of releases since re-emerging in the PC game cracking scene, SKIDROW made cryptic remarks that the techniques used by CONSPIR4CY, STEAMPUNKS, and members of the Steam Underground warez forum to crack modern copy protections are not proper. These criticisms were themselves criticized on the web, as SKIDROW's apparent standards for a proper crack would seemingly disqualify both their most notable crack of Ubisoft's persistent online connection requiring DRM, which they emulated, and their most recent notable release of a Denuvo-protected game, which they cracked by modifying the executable from another game.

=== Steam Underground ===
While not precisely a group, the community centered around the Steam Underground web forum (also known as cs.rin.ru) and its members have been a notable source of warez development, releases, tools, tutorials, discussions, and information pertinent to other groups since at least 2008. The forum has both Russian and English language boards, and is the home to a number of projects primarily focused on cracking, emulating, and otherwise extending the capabilities of Steam and games released on Steam. Games on other platforms may also be discussed on their own board.

The forum and its members have often been referenced as some variation of "the Russian site/forum" or directly by name by warez scene groups in statements which mention the site. At least one prominent member of the forum has been in contact with warez scene release group members, as they published several non-public cracks for The Sims 4 which they attributed to tools or methods obtained from the cracking group RELOADED. This individual was then given access or knowledge related to EA's Origin licensing scheme and DRM, as they began to release their own cracks for updated versions of The Sims 4 based on the same cracking technique.

The site is also notable for being one of the few that actively distributes cracked games for the Oculus Quest VR headset.

Steam Underground encountered a financial problem because their biggest supporter, Russian Information Network (RIN), stopped sponsoring the forum after 17 years of support for the Underground. As a result, Google Drive uploads by the member RUI are no longer available because he can no longer afford the payment that Google demands.

=== STEAMPUNKS ===
STEAMPUNKS released unauthorized copies of games which utilized Denuvo digital rights management solutions in 2017, with their first releases being copies of Dishonored 2, ADR1FT, Planet Coaster, and ABZU. Releases by STEAMPUNKS include a license generator which creates a valid hardware ID-based license file. These licenses appear to be identical to those generated by the web-based activation servers operated by Denuvo, and they do not trigger Denuvo's DRM copy protection. This method attracted some attention upon its debut, while license generators and "keymakers" were fairly common in commercial software piracy, they had fallen out of use in cracking games as most games moved to the license management capabilities provided by Steam and other digital distribution platforms. One negative reaction to STEAMPUNKS' license maker came from the warez group SKIDROW in a statement from the group released in July 2017. In late September 2017, STEAMPUNKS became the first warez group to release cracked copies of Denuvo DRM-protected games within 24 hours of their commercial availability, releasing both Total War: Warhammer II and FIFA 18 on the same day they were made available for consumers. STEAMPUNKS collaborated with CODEX to crack South Park: The Fractured but Whole upon its release, with the cracked release appearing under the portmanteau group name "CODEPUNKS". Following this and one other collaborative release, STEAMPUNKS became inactive, while CODEX continued to publish cracked versions of games. At least one of STEAMPUNKS' crackers was originally a member of X-FORCE (known for their Adobe software keygens), and at least one other member of STEAMPUNKS would become a member of CODEX after the group became inactive.

=== Superior Art Creations ===
Superior Art Creations (SAC) is an underground artscene group which caters primarily to, and is well known within, the warez scene.

=== Tristar and Red Sector Incorporated ===
Tristar and Red Sector, Inc. (also known as TRSI) began as an alliance between two warez groups: Tristar and Red Sector Incorporated. They were formed in 1990 as a cooperative Commodore 64 demo coding and cracking group. TRSI migrated from the Commodore 64 release platform to the Amiga and IBM-PC, and eventually branched off into the console gaming scene before finally disbanding their warez division. In late 2003, TRSI became inactive and remains so today.

=== United Software Association ===
The United Software Association (also known as USA) was a prominent IBM PC games and applications warez group during the 1990s. USA formed an alliance with the PC warez division of Fairlight which was known as "USA/FLT". In late January 1992, several members of USA were arrested by the United States Secret Service and the Farmington Hills, Michigan police for credit card fraud.

=== ViTALiTY ===
ViTALiTY (also known as VTY) was founded in May 2005. It has been suggested they were former members of DEViANCE. The group was considered blacklisted by many in the warez scene in October 2007, something ViTALiTY claims was orchestrated by rival groups RELOADED and FAiRLiGHT, though the latter claim they were against it. ViTALiTY was accused of either reporting or threatening to report members of other groups to the FBI, though ViTALiTY claimed a senior member of RELOADED threatened to do the same to them. ViTALiTY's last release was an update to Dragon Age: Origins on 7 January 2011.

== See also ==
- Comparison of BitTorrent sites
- Crack intro
- Nuke (warez)
- Standard (warez)
- The Scene
- Topsite (warez)
- 3DM
- Online piracy
