= Operation Site Down =

Operation Site Down is the umbrella name for a law enforcement initiative conducted by the United States' FBI and law enforcement agents from ten other countries which resulted in a raid on targets on June 29, 2005. Three separate undercover investigations were involved, based in Chicago, Charlotte and San Jose. The raid consisted of approximately 70 searches in the U.S. and approximately 20 others in ten other countries in an effort to disrupt and dismantle many of the leading Warez groups which distribute and trade in copyrighted software, movies, music and games on the Internet.

On February 1, 2006, the U.S. Attorney's Office under Patrick Fitzgerald announced that it was indicting nineteen members of Risciso, a software and movie infringement ring, in U.S. District Court in Chicago. The lead prosecutor for the government in this case was Assistant U.S. Attorney Pravin Rao.

Up to May 6, 2008, there had been over 40 convictions as a result of the ongoing investigation. As part of each plea agreement, each defendant has agreed to forfeit the equipment that was seized during the federal search warrants executed on June 29, 2005.

== Sentences ==
Mark G. Carter II (a.k.a. Burner), 29, of Upland, California, was sentenced to 30 months' imprisonment, and ordered to pay $34,964 in restitution. Judge Whyte also sentenced the defendant to a three-year period of supervised release. On December 12, 2005, Carter pleaded guilty to one count of violating the NET Act and to one count of conspiracy to commit criminal copyright infringement. The defendant began serving the sentence on October 26, 2006, after being sentenced on June 12, 2006.

Ryan Zeman, 23, of Rohnert Park, California, was sentenced to three years' probation, four months' home confinement, four months' community confinement, and required to pay $120,000 in restitution. On October 3, 2005, Zeman pleaded guilty to violating the NET Act, 17 U.S.C. § 506(a)(1)(B) and 18 U.S.C. § 2319(c)(1), and aiding and abetting.

Gregory Dickman, 25, of Wilmington, North Carolina, was sentenced to 8 months' home confinement, three years of probation and ordered to pay $31,515 in restitution. On April 10, 2006, Dickman pleaded guilty to conspiring to commit criminal copyright infringement in violation of 18 U.S.C. § 371 and to violating the NET Act, 17 U.S.C. § 506(a)(1)(B) and 18 U.S.C. § 2319(c)(1), and aiding and abetting.

Johnny Russell, 34, of Spring, Texas, was sentenced to 8 months in a community confinement facility, three years of probation, and ordered to pay a $11,508 in restitution. On April 10, 2006, Russell pleaded guilty to conspiring to commit criminal copyright infringement in violation of 18 U.S.C. § 371 and to violating the NET Act, 17 U.S.C. § 506(a)(1)(B) and 18 U.S.C. § 2319(c)(1), and aiding and abetting.

== Similarities to The Scene miniseries ==
An online film series titled The Scene is a fictional take on the actual bootlegging scene. Some claims have been made that there are coincidences between the series and actual events.

The main character is Brian Sandro, an NYU student, who also infringes Hollywood movies in his spare time. Sandro heads the movie release group, CPX.

In episode nine, released in the beginning of June 2005, Sandro, whose IRC alias is Drosan, is messaged by a member named Gryffin. Gryffin was earlier looking for members of CPX in a different IRC channel. Gryffin's friend's father apparently works at a film studio and Gryffin is asking to be a supplier to CPX. The Gryffin character in the scene comes off as a little mysterious, but otherwise harmless.

However, it was pointed out that his name is similar to the nickname of the actual lead FBI agent, Griffen, responsible for the busts in Operation Site Down. Also, in the messaging session between Drosan and Gryffin, the music playing in the background periodically says "he works for the FBI" in a trancelike fashion.

Jun Productions, the creators of The Scene, deny all accounts that they had insider information about the arrests and that the similarities are only coincidences.

However, according to a Slyck posting, Gryffin the character and Griffen the FBI agent shared the same BNC the.yankees-suck.net. The vhost resolves to Hurricane Electric, which is the location of the two Fed topsites: CHUD and LAD.

Furthermore, Bruce Forrest, who was quoted in a Wired article as a self-proclaimed "double agent", was an active correspondent for The Scene series. While Jun Productions claim that Forrest had no involvement in the ninth episode (he supposedly left on his own terms after the eighth episode), some speculate that it could have been an elaborate warning by Forrest about the impending Federal arrests.

== See also ==
- Operation Buccaneer
- Operation Fastlink
- Operation D-Elite
