= Operation Fastlink =

2004 international copyright enforcement operation

- Part of Operation Higher Education
- Operation name: Operation Fastlink
- Part of: Operation Higher Education

Participants
- Planned by: U.S. Federal Bureau of Investigation (FBI), U.S. Department of Justice (DOJ), Interpol
- Initiated by: United States
- Executed by: United States, Interpol
- Countries participating: Belgium, Denmark, France, Germany, Hungary, Israel, the Netherlands, Singapore, Sweden, as well as the United Kingdom
- No. of countries participating: 12

Timeline
- Date begin: after 2004
- Date end: before 2007

Results
- Arrests: 120
- Convictions: 60

Operation Fastlink is a coordination of four separate, simultaneous undercover investigations by the Federal Bureau of Investigation (FBI) Cyber Division, the Department of Justice, the Computer Crimes and Intellectual Property Section (CCIPS) of the Criminal Division and Interpol. The four different investigations have not been publicly enumerated, but the U.S. Department of Justice has said in at least one press release that "Operation Higher Education" is the largest component, with participation from twelve nations. Mention has also been made of an investigation into pre-release music groups led by FBI agents from the Washington Field Office. As of March 6, 2009, the FBI states that Operation Fastlink has yielded 60 convictions. The raids occurred in similar fashion to those from Operation Buccaneer and Operation Site Down. Other somewhat-related law enforcement actions include Operation Gridlock and Operation D-Elite.

The operation led to the successful busts of nearly 100 individuals involved in illegal copying of copyrighted software, and alterations thereof, worldwide. There were around 120 total searches executed in 27 American states and in 10 foreign countries. Foreign searches were conducted in Belgium, Denmark, France, Germany, Hungary, Israel, the Netherlands, Singapore, Sweden, as well as the United Kingdom.

Among the prolific warez release groups targeted by Fastlink were Fairlight, Kalisto, Echelon, Class, and DEViANCE—all of which specialized in spreading unlicensed copies of computer and console video games. Recent convictions have included members of music release groups Apocalypse Production Crew and Chromance.

== Cases ==
1. Jathan Desir (known as "jd333"), a University of Iowa student of Iowa City, Iowa, pleaded guilty on December 22, 2004 to charges related to his role and was sentenced to one year's probation, $5,000 fine, and $300 CVF assessment, which was completed in 2010. The case was 4:04-cr-00336 from the U.S. District Court for the Southern District of Iowa.
2. Abell (known as "joebob") pleaded guilty to conspiracy to commit copyright infringement on February 28, 2005. He was sentenced to 15 months in prison, 400 hours of community service and two years' probation. The case is 5:04-cr-00681 from the U.S. District Court for the Western District of Texas.
3. Lai (known as "doplgnger") pleaded guilty to one count of conspiracy to commit criminal copyright infringement on January 6, 2006 related to his administering several warez FTP sites. He was sentenced on June 18, 2007 to three years of probation, the first six months of which he must serve confined to his home. He was also ordered to pay a fine in the amount of $7,200 and to perform 120 hours of community service. The case is 3:06-cr-00004 from the U.S. District Court for the District of Connecticut.
4. Kleinberg (known as "basilisk") pleaded guilty on March 8, 2005 and faces a maximum sentence of 10 years in prison. Sentencing was originally scheduled for July 1, 2005, but has been delayed to January 6, 2006. He admitted to being a supplier for Fairlight and Kalisto while being Executive Editor of Game Over Online Magazine. The case is 3:05-cr-00049 from the U.S. District Court for the District of Connecticut. Kleinberg eventually received a reduced sentence of 3 years' probation, 200 hours of community service and was ordered to pay a $15,000 fine.
5. Jeffrey Lerman (known as "ht"), a University of Maryland, College Park student from Long Island, New York, pleaded guilty on March 8, 2005 and was sentenced to six months of house arrest, three years' probation, and a $7,500 fine. Lerman repackaged and restructured PlayStation 2 games, originally distributed on DVDs, for redistribution on CDs for Kalisto. The case is 3:05-cr-00050 from the U.S. District Court for the District of Connecticut.
6. Albert Bryndza, of Flushing, New York, pleaded guilty on March 8, 2005, was sentenced to three years' probation and ordered to pay a fine of $7,500. The case is 3:05-cr-00051 from the U.S. District Court for the District of Connecticut.
7. Weiss pleaded guilty on September 12, 2005 to criminal copyright infringement. Sentenced on January 12, 2006 to three years' probation, pay $20,914 in restitution, and complete 500 hours of community service. 1:05-cr-00577 from the U.S. District Court for the Eastern District of New York.
8. Ringe was indicted for criminal copyright infringement on September 13, 2005. Unknown case from the U.S. District Court for the District of Arizona.
9. Christopher M. Streit was originally indicted on a criminal copyright infringement charge in the Southern District of Iowa. On March 10, 2005, his case was transferred to the Eastern District of North Carolina. He pleaded guilty on April 11, 2005 and was sentenced to five years' probation, 180 days of home confinement, and imposed a $500 fine on September 6, 2005. The case is 5:05-cr-00066 from the U.S. District Court for the Eastern District of North Carolina.
10. Joseph J. Huss Jr., pleaded guilty to two counts of conspiracy and criminal copyright infringement on July 28, 2005. He was sentenced to five years' probation, a $200 special assessment, and a $5,000 fine for each of the counts on November 10, 2005. The case is 2:05-cr-00002 from U.S. District Court for the Eastern District of Pennsylvania.
11. Timothy Mentzer's three criminal copyright infringement charges were transferred from the Southern District of Iowa. He pleaded guilty on August 3, 2005. He was scheduled to be sentenced June 19, 2006. The case is 2:05-cr-00002 from U.S. District Court for the Eastern District of Pennsylvania.
12. George Scott Hayes, of Danville, Virginia, pleaded guilty on February 13, 2006 to one count of criminal copyright infringement related to his involvement in music release group "Chromance." Sentencing was scheduled for May 19, 2006. The case is 1:06-cr-00032 from the U.S. District Court for the Eastern District of Virginia.
13. Derek A. Borchardt (known as 'Mickey'), of Charlotte, North Carolina; Ramiesh Yogarada, 18, of Winston-Salem, North Carolina; Matthew B. Howard, of Longmont, Colorado; and Aaron O. Jones, of Hillsboro, Oregon each pleaded guilty on February 28, 2006 to one count of conspiracy to commit copyright infringement for their involvement in the music release group Apocalypse Production Crew. Sentencing was scheduled for May 19, 2006. The case is 1:06-cr-00041 from the U.S. District Court for the Eastern District of Virginia.
14. Sergey Ribiakost, of Bardonia, New York, pleaded guilty on April 17, 2007 to one count of conspiracy to commit copyright infringement for his involvement with the music release group Apocalypse Production Crew. On August 9, 2007, Ribiakost was sentenced to two years probation and a fine of $3000. The case is 1:06-cr-00373 from the U.S. District Court for the Eastern District of Virginia
15. Bryan Thomas Black, of Waterloo, Illinois pleaded guilty on March 6, 2009 to one count of conspiracy to commit criminal infringement of a copyright for his involvement in a multinational software infringement organization. On August 18, 2009, Black was sentenced to 3 years of probation.

All cases and case documents can be found on CourtListener.

== See also ==
- Operation Buccaneer
- Operation D-Elite
- Operation Site Down
