= Operation Buccaneer =

International copyright anti-piracy operation

Operation Buccaneer is an "ongoing international copyright piracy investigation and prosecution" undertaken by the United States federal government. It was part of a crackdown divided into three parts: Operation Bandwidth, Operation Buccaneer and Digital Piratez.

An undercover operation began in October 2000. On December 11, 2001, law enforcement agents in six countries targeted 62 people suspected of violating software copyright, with leads in twenty other countries. U.S. law enforcement agents, led by the United States Customs Service, raided computers in the economics department of the Massachusetts Institute of Technology, the University of California, Los Angeles, an "off-campus location" of the University of Oregon, and dorm rooms at Duke University and Purdue University. Information obtained led to a subsequent raid at the Rochester Institute of Technology, described by "warez gadfly 'ttol'" as one of "the two major hubs for communications between pirate groups" (along with the University of Twente in the Netherlands). However, the universities themselves were not considered targets of the criminal investigation. Several software companies were also raided.

"The Customs Service said it had singled out DrinkOrDie because it was considered one of the most sophisticated of the rings operating within a loose, global network." The DrinkOrDie site, where non-free software could be downloaded for free, was shut down the following day. However, Farhad Manjoo wrote in a Wired magazine article that others were puzzled why the group was targeted; Manjoo characterized them as "small potatoes in the world of software theft", while an anonymous Australian infringer was quoted as saying, "they aren't the first to come to mind when you think to yourself 'who's the big deal in the scene?'"

Around 70 search warrants were served and 150 computers were seized for analysis. Raids were also conducted in Canada, Britain, Australia, Finland, Norway and Sweden. Other groups investigated in the operation were warez groups such as Risciso, Razor 1911, RequestToSend (RTS), ShadowRealm (SRM), WeLoveWarez (WLW) and POPZ.

Related law enforcement actions include: Operation Fastlink, Operation Digital Gridlock, Operation D-Elite and Operation Site Down.

== Quotations ==
"This investigation underscores the severity and scope of a multibillion-dollar software swindle over the Internet, as well as the vulnerabilities of this technology to outside attack."

— Robert C. Bonner, commissioner of the Customs Service

"Our targets are not your stereotypical teenage hacker."

— Customs assistant commissioner John Varrone

"This is not a sport. This is a serious crime. These people should do some hard time."

— Commerce undersecretary Phil Bond

"Software piracy undermines the stability of the burgeoning e-commerce industry and it is a direct threat to innovative companies that help strengthen the U.S. economy."

— Deputy U.S. Treasury Secretary Kenneth Dam

"This investigation only assist the multibillion-dollar companies to swindle you, the avid consumer, as well as the vulnerable people that deem information should be free, sure we would like people to buy the games they test play, but it doesn't happen because people have to pay #$ a gallon for gas and shit. Technology is to be used for the good of all, not some fat ass company man who doesn't know the first thing from a rar to a iso...... Gravy is awful good."

— buj, Member of razor 1911

== Felony convictions ==
As of October 2002, 17 people have been convicted of felonies in the United States, with 13 given federal prison terms of up to 46 months. In addition, Australian resident Hew Raymond Griffiths, the self-admitted leader of DrinkorDie, fought extradition to the United States for almost three years, but eventually lost and was sentenced to 51 months, though he was credited for the time served in an Australian jail.

In the United Kingdom, six were formally charged. In May 2005, some DrinkorDie members were the first to be sentenced in the United Kingdom as a result of Operation Buccaneer.

Convictions in the United States
Name	Scenename	Conviction date	Offense	Sentence
Berry, Richard	Flood	April 29, 2002	Conspiracy	
Buchanan, Anthony	spaceace	August 19, 2002	Criminal copyright infringement	
Clardy, Andrew	Doodad	April 4, 2002	Criminal copyright infringement Aiding and abetting	
Cole, Myron	t3rminal	July 10, 2002	Criminal copyright infringement	
Eiser, Derek	Psychod	June 21, 2002	Criminal copyright infringement	
Erickson, Barry	Radsl	May 2, 2002	Conspiracy	
Grimes, David A.	Chevelle	March 4, 2002	Conspiracy	
Gross, Robert	targetpractice	May 22, 2002	Criminal copyright infringement	
Hunt, Nathan	Azide	April 3, 2002	Conspiracy	
Kartadinata, Kent	Tenkuken	January 31, 2002	Conspiracy	
Kelly, Michael	Erupt	April 10, 2002	Conspiracy	
Nawara, Stacey	Avec	March 19, 2002	Conspiracy	
Nguyen, Mike	Hackrat	January 31, 2002	Conspiracy	
Pattanayek, Sabuj	Buj	April 11, 2002	Conspiracy	41 months
Riffe, John	blue	May 9, 2002	Criminal copyright infringement	
Sankus, John Jr.	eriFlleH	February 27, 2002	Conspiracy	46 months
Tresco, Christopher	BigRar	May 28, 2002	Conspiracy	33 months

== Raid locations ==
Countries
- Australia
- Belgium
- Canada
- Denmark
- Finland
- France
- New Zealand
- Germany
- Hungary
- Israel
- Netherlands
- Norway
- Singapore
- Spain
- Sweden
- United Kingdom
- United States of America
United States cities
- Atlanta, Georgia
- Austin, Texas
- Baton Rouge, Louisiana
- Boston, Massachusetts
- Charlotte, North Carolina
- Chicago, Illinois
- Cincinnati, Ohio
- Eugene, Oregon
- Dallas, Texas
- Durham, North Carolina
- Cocoa Beach, Florida
- Galesburg, Illinois
- Houston, Texas
- Miami, Florida
- New Haven, Connecticut
- New York, New York
- Newark, New Jersey
- Norfolk, Virginia
- Oklahoma City, Oklahoma
- Orlando, Florida
- Oxnard, California
- Philadelphia, Pennsylvania
- Phoenix, Arizona
- Pittsburgh, Pennsylvania
- Portland, Oregon
- Rochester, New York
- San Francisco, California
- St. Louis, Missouri
- Washington, D.C.
- Wilmington, Delaware

== See also ==
- Operation D-Elite
- Operation Fastlink
- Operation Site Down
- Operation Cyberstorm
