= Crack intro =

Credit sequence added to cracked software

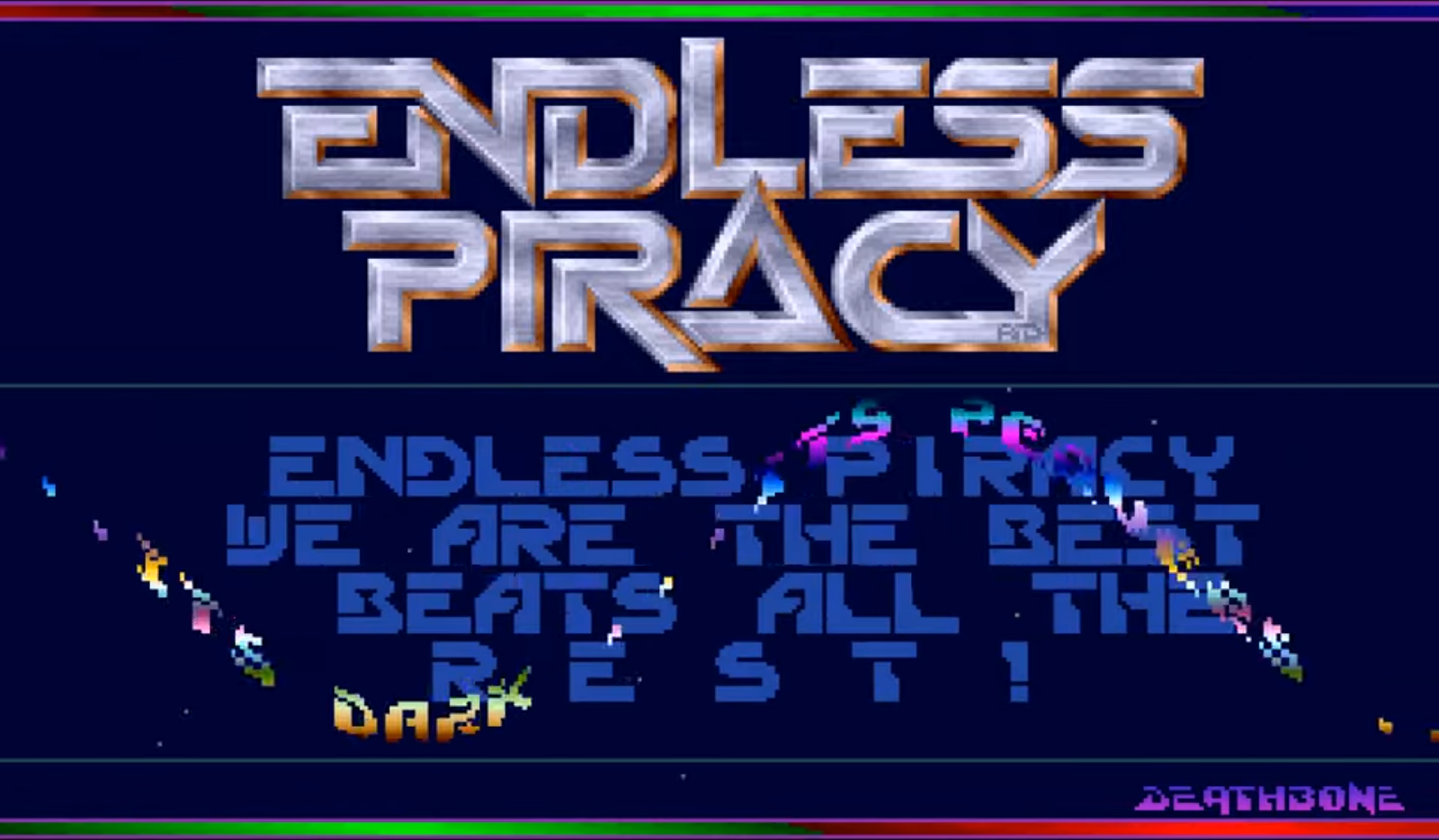
A crack intro for the Amiga by the hacker group Endless Piracy.

A crack intro, commonly abbreviated as cracktro, is a small introduction sequence added to keygens and cracked software aimed at informing the user about which cracking crew or individual cracker removed the software's copy protection and distributed the crack or keygen.

== History ==
Crack intros first appeared on Apple II computers in the late 1970s or early 1980s, and then on ZX Spectrum, Commodore 64 and Amstrad CPC games that were distributed around the world via Bulletin Board Systems (BBSes) and floppy disk copying. By 1985, when reviewing the commercially available ISEPIC cartridge which adds a custom crack intro to memory dumps of Commodore 64 software, Ahoy! wrote that such intros were "in the tradition of the true hacker". Early crack intros resemble graffiti in many ways, although they invaded the private sphere and not the public space.

As time went on, crack intros became a medium to demonstrate the purported superiority of a cracking group. Such intros grew very complex, sometimes exceeding the size and complexity of the software itself. Crack intros only became more sophisticated on more advanced systems such as the Amiga, Atari ST, and some IBM PC compatibles with sound cards. These intros feature big, colourful effects, music, and scrollers.

Cracking groups would use the intros not just to gain credit for cracking, but to advertise their BBSes, greet friends, and gain themselves recognition. Messages were frequently of a vulgar nature, and on some occasions made threats of violence against software companies or the members of some rival crack-group.

Crack-intro programming eventually became an art form in its own right, and people started coding intros without attaching them to a crack just to show off how well they could program. This practice evolved into the demoscene.

Crack intros and other small software created by software crackers such as keygens and patches that remove protection from commercial applications often use chiptunes made in music trackers for background music. These chiptunes are now still accessible as downloadable musicdisks or musicpacks.

== See also ==
- Hacker subculture
- List of warez groups
- Replay: The History of Video Games – The book describes the Dutch demo making as a major influence on video games in the 1980s.
- Warez scene
- Demoscene
