= .nfo =

File name extension for a Warez scene release description file

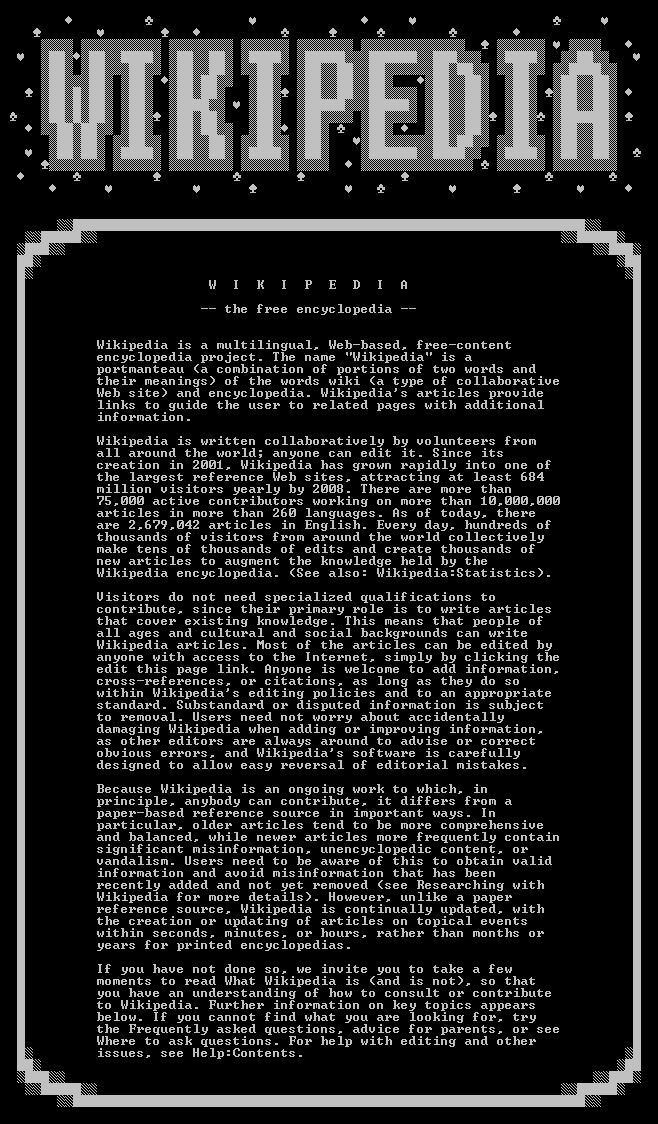
- Screenshot of a Warez scene release info file
- Filename extension: .nfo
- Internet media type: text/x-nfo
- Initial release: January 23, 1990; 36 years ago
- Type of format: Plain text
- Website: nforce.nl

In the Warez scene, .nfo (short for info) is a file name extension for a text file (sometimes called an NFO file) that accompanies and describes a release of pirated software or media. The file contains information such as title, authorship, year and license information. For software, it might contain installation notes. This information is delivered for publishing through digital media to make it searchable on the web as well as within local catalogues and libraries. This type of file is also often found in a demoscene production, where the respective group includes it for credits, contact details, and the software requirements.

This type of file has been described as the press release of the warez scene. Info files were ubiquitous, and sometimes required, during the era of the Bulletin Board System (BBS). The file was a stamp of authenticity, explicitly explaining what group released the software and described what modifications (or cracks) were applied if any. Once a software was packaged with an info file and then released, it was then officially owned by that group and no other group could ethically re-release that particular package. A typical warez info file was elaborate and highly decorated, and usually included a large ASCII art logo along with software release and extended warez group information. The most important information is which group, which cracker and which member actually tested and packaged. The designers of these info files, who worked closely or within the warez groups, frequently incorporated extended ASCII characters from the character set code page 437 in the file.

As of 2019, info files can still be found in many ZIP archives. In modern-day warez info files, a large ASCII art logo is frequently shown at the top, followed by textual information below.

== History ==
The release info file was first introduced by "Fabulous Furlough" of the elite PC warez organization called The Humble Guys, or THG. The THG group would first upload their package to their world headquarters, "Candyland BBS" or later "The P.I.T.S. BBS", to establish distribution immediately. Such organizations are also known as warez groups or crack groups. The first use came in 1990 on the THG release of the PC game Knights of Legend. This file was used in lieu of the more common README.TXT or README.1ST file names. The perpetuation of this file extension legacy was carried on by warez groups which followed after THG and is still in use to this day. Hence its strong presence on Usenet newsgroups that carry binaries and on P2P file trading networks.

The Humble Guys later became a demogroup, thus bringing the same info file tradition to the demoscene. More than forty thousand demoscene productions have an info file next to the program file.

== ASCII art ==
Often, an info file contains elaborate ANSI art. In contrast, the typical README file does not.

As an info file is a plain text, the art can be rendered and viewed via a text editor. For best results, one may need to select a monospace font and enable "US Latin" or "extended ASCII". On Windows 95, using Microsoft Notepad the Terminal font set to 11pt usually produced a good rendering of art. However, web browsers use an incompatible encoding scheme resulting in incorrect rendering of info files. Also, many modern text editors often use proportional fonts whereas ASCII art is designed to be viewed in a fixed-width font. For these reasons, dedicated info file viewers were developed to use appropriate fonts (such as Terminus) and encoding settings, automatic window size and clickable hyperlinks. Additionally, online info file viewers are available to browse public info files.

Before Windows 95 was introduced, info files sometimes included ANSI-escape sequences to encode animated ASCII art. These animations, however, required ANSI.SYS to be loaded by the DOS shell. If the computer wasn't already configured to load the ANSI.SYS driver, viewing ANSI art required reconfiguring and rebooting. Because of this, ANSI art was much less common, and getting ANSI art to display correctly on a Windows 95 PC often proved more difficult, leading to a decline of such art in info files.

The ASCII code page 437 character set was originally designed by IBM for the earliest DOS PCs. It was not intended to be used throughout the non-English world. More modern ASCII art tends to use the de facto web standard ISO-8859-1/ISO-8859-15 or Unicode UTF-8 characters.

== Related ==
Home theater
Kodi uses an XML-formatted NFO file for its home theater media library. Plex Media Server uses an NFO file for match movie library. FileBot can fetch artwork and generate NFO files for TV shows or movies. NFO files are also used by media managers ViMediaManager, tinyMediaManager, Ember Media Manager, CouchPotato - a usenet and torrents client, MediaElch, TV show organizer Media Companion, digital media library manager Media Center Master. An NFO plug-in is also available for OPUS, an open access repositories software.

Windows system information
On Windows, the .nfo extension is used with the System Information tool (msinfo32.exe) which can report on a computer system's specifications, hardware components and the operating system environment. This information is stored as XML.

== See also ==
- README
- FILE_ID.DIZ
- The iSONEWS
- .sfv - Simple file verification
