= Warez =

Movies, software or music distributed in violation of copyright

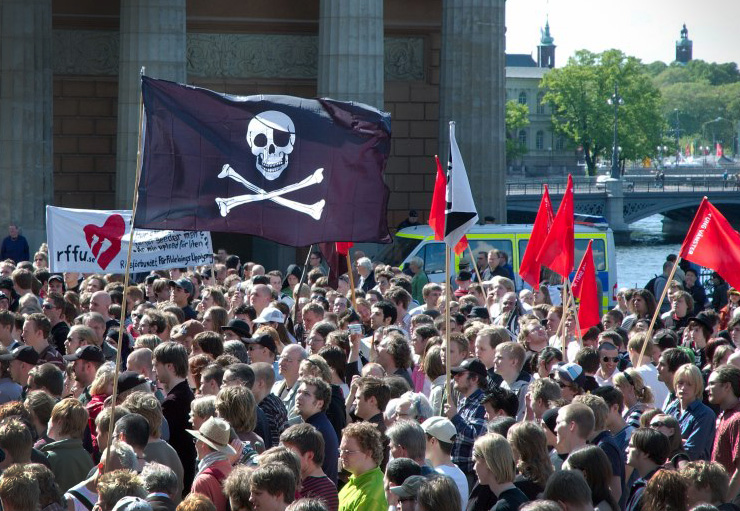
Demonstration in support of "fildelning" (file sharing, including of warez), in Sweden in 2006.

Warez is a common computing and broader cultural term referring to pirated software (i.e. illegally copied, often after deactivation of anti-piracy measures) that is distributed via the Internet. Warez is used most commonly as a noun, a plural form of ware (short for computer software), and is intended to be pronounced like the word wares /ˈwɛərz/. The circumvention of copy protection (cracking) is an essential step in generating warez, and based on this common mechanism, the software-focused definition has been extended to include other copyright-protected materials, including movies and games. The global array of warez groups has been referred to as "The Scene", deriving from its earlier description as "the warez scene". Distribution and trade of copyrighted works without payment of fees or royalties generally violates national and international copyright laws and agreements. The term warez covers supported as well as unsupported (abandonware) items, and legal prohibitions governing creation and distribution of warez cover both profit-driven and "enthusiast" generators and distributors of such items.

== Terminology ==
Warez, and its leetspeak form W4r3z, are plural representations of the word "ware" (short for computer software), and are terms used to refer to "[p]irated software distributed over the Internet," that is, "[s]oftware that has been illegally copied and made available" e.g., after having "protection codes de-activated". "Cracking", or circumventing copy protection, is an essential part of the warez process," and via this commonality, the definition focused on computer software has been extended to include other forms of material under copyright protection, especially movies. As Aaron Schwabach notes, the term covers both supported and unsupported materials (the latter termed abandonware), and legal recourses aimed at stemming the creation and distribution of warez are designed to cover both profit-driven and "enthusiast" practitioners. Hence, the term refers to copyrighted works that are distributed without fees or royalties and so traded in general violation of copyright law.

The term warez, which is intended to be pronounced like the word "wares" (/ˈwɛərz/), was coined in the 1990s; its origin is with an unknown member of an underground computing circle, but has since become commonplace among Internet users and the mass media. It is used most commonly as a noun: "My neighbour downloaded 10 gigabytes of warez yesterday"; but has also been used as a verb: "The new Windows was warezed a month before the company officially released it". The global collection of warez groups has been referred to as "The Warez Scene," or more ambiguously "The Scene."

While the term 'piracy' is commonly used to describe a significant range of activities, most of which are unlawful, the relatively neutral meaning in this context is "[...] mak[ing] use of or reproduc[ing] the work of another without authorization". Some groups, including the GNU Project of the Free Software Foundation, object to the use of this and other words such as "theft" because they represent an attempt to create a particular impression in the reader:

Publishers often refer to prohibited copying as "piracy." In this way, they imply that illegal copying is ethically equivalent to attacking ships on the high seas, kidnapping and murdering the people on them.

The Free Software Foundation advocates the use of terms like "prohibited copying" or "unauthorized copying", or "sharing information with your neighbor." Hence, the term "software pirate" is controversial; FSF derides its use, while many self-described pirates take pride in the term, and some groups (e.g., Pirates with Attitudes) fully embrace it.

Direct download sites (DDL) are web locations that index links to locations where files can be directly downloaded to the user's computer; many such sites link to free file hosting services, for the hosting of materials. DDL sites do not directly host the material and can avoid the fees that normally accompany large file hosting.

== Motivations and arguments ==
The production and/or distribution of warez is illegal in most countries due to the protections provided in the TRIPS Agreement. Software infringers generally exploit the international nature of the copyright issue to avoid law enforcement in specific countries. Violations are typically overlooked in poorer third world countries, and other countries with weak or non-existent protection for intellectual property. Additionally, some first world countries have loopholes in legislation that allow the warez to continue.

There is also a movement, exemplified by groups like The Pirate Party and scholars at The Mises Institute, that the very idea of intellectual property is an anathema to free society. This is in contrast to some of the more traditional open source advocates such as Lawrence Lessig, who advocate for middle ground between freedom and intellectual property.

== Legality ==
Generally, there are four elements of criminal copyright infringement: the existence of a valid copyright, that copyright was infringed, the infringement was willful, and the infringement was either substantial, or for commercial gain (at levels often set by statute). Offering warez is generally understood to be a form of copyright infringement that is punishable as either a civil wrong or a crime.

Often, sites hosting torrent files claim that they are not breaking any laws because they are not offering the actual data; rather, the sites only offer a link to other places or peers that contain the infringing material. However, many prosecution cases and convictions argue to the contrary. For instance, Dimitri Mader, the French national who operates a movie distribution warez site, Wawa-Mania, was fined 20,000 € and sentenced, in absentia, to a year in jail by a European court (after fleeing France for the Philippines), for his role in managing the site. In the U.S., through 2004, more than 80 individuals had been prosecuted and convicted for trade in warez products (under the NET Act and other statutes), for movie and software pirating in particular, with a number of individuals being imprisoned, including some enthusiast traders.

However, laws and their application to warez activities may vary greatly from country to country; for instance, while Wawa-Mania is under sanction in France, it remains in operation via a host in Moldova, and through use of an Ecuadorian top-level domain. Hence, while high-profile web hosts and domain providers generally do not permit the hosting of warez, and delete sites found to be hosting them, private endeavours and small commercial entities continue to allow the trade in warez to continue. And, in some countries, and at some times, software "piracy" has been encouraged, and international and usual national legal protections ignored. A dispute between Iran and United States over membership in WTO and subsequent U.S. block of Iran's attempts at full-membership has led Iran to encourage the copying of U.S. software; hence, there has been a subsequent surge in Iranian "warez" and "crackz" websites (as Iranian laws do not forbid hosting them inside Iran). The same policy has been adopted by Antigua, and others.

== Distribution ==
Warez scene hierarchy.

Warez are often distributed outside of The Scene (a collection of warez groups) by torrents (files including tracker info, piece size, uncompressed file size, comments, and vary in size from 1 k, to 400 k.) uploaded to a popular P2P website by an associate or friend of the cracker or cracking crew. An nfo or FILE ID.DIZ is often made to promote who created the release. It is then leeched (downloaded) by users of the tracker and spread to other sharing sites using P2P, or other sources such as newsgroups. From there, it can be downloaded by millions of users all over the world. Often, one release is duplicated, renamed, then re-uploaded to different sites so that eventually, it can become impossible to trace the original file. Another increasingly popular method of distributing Warez is via one-click hosting websites. In the early 1990s, warez were often published on bulletin boards that had a warez section.

=== Rise of software infringement ===
Unauthorized copying has been an ongoing phenomenon that started when high quality, commercially produced software was released for sale. Whether the medium was cassette tape or floppy disk, cracking enthusiasts found a way to duplicate the software and spread it without the permission of the maker. Bootlegging communities were built around the Apple II, Commodore 64, Atari 8-bit computers, ZX Spectrum, Amiga, Atari ST and other systems. Entire networks of BBSes sprang up to traffic illegal software from one user to the next. Machines like the Amiga and the Commodore 64 had an international network, through which software not available on one continent would eventually make its way to every region via bulletin board systems.

It was also common in the 1980s to use physical floppy disks and the postal service for spreading software, in an activity known as mail trading. Prior to the sale of software that came on CD-ROM discs and after hard drives had become available, the software did not require the floppy disc to be in the drive when starting and using the program. So, a user could install it onto their computer and mail the disk to the next person, who could do the same. Particularly widespread in continental Europe, mail trading was even used by many of the leading cracker groups as their primary channel of interaction. Software copyright violation via mail trading was also the most common means for many computer hobbyists in the Eastern bloc countries to receive new Western software for their computers.

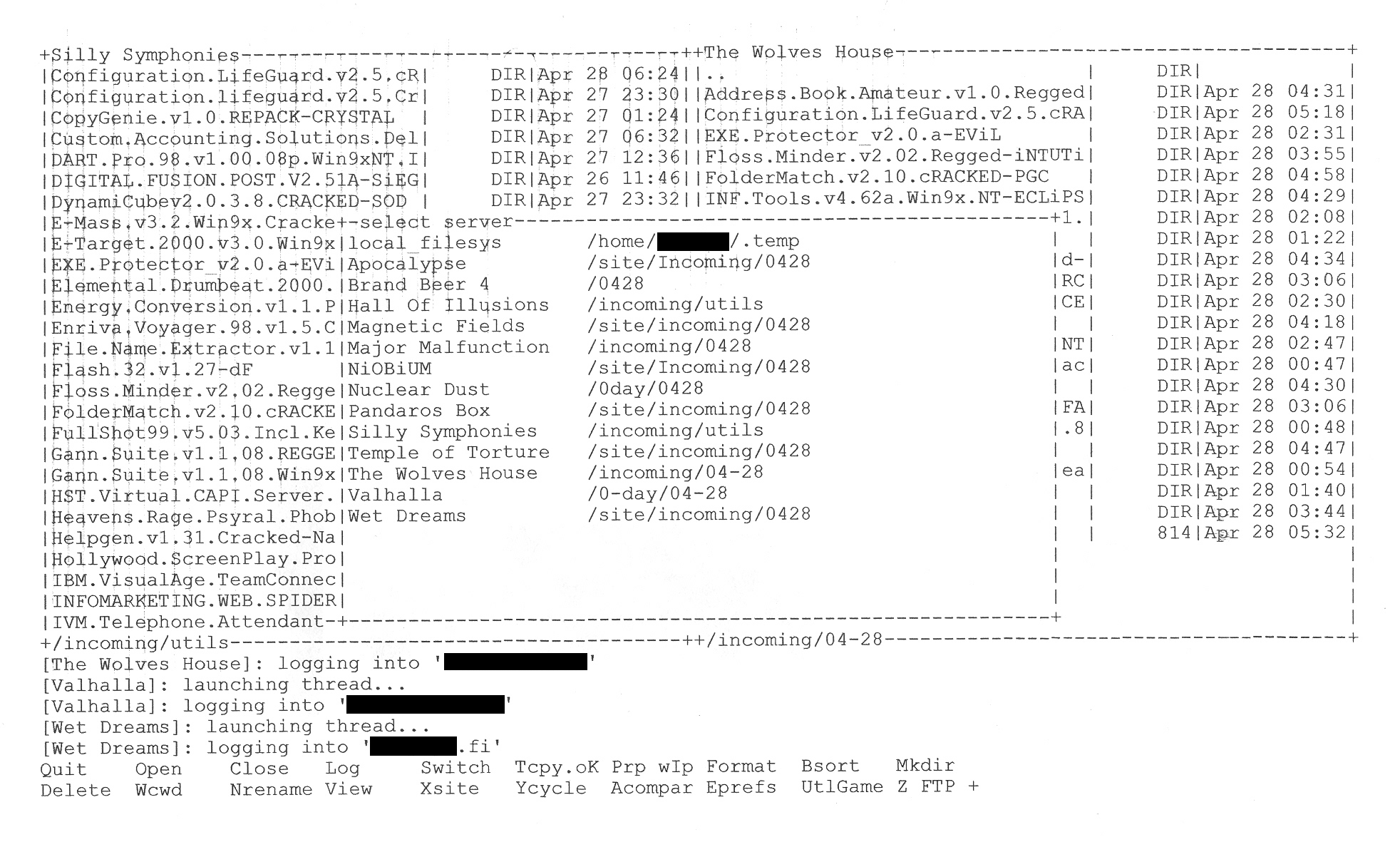
A screenshot of pftp logged into several FTP sites. This tool was used by couriers to quickly and easily move large amounts of software from one site to many others. Since couriering was competitive, using this tool was considered cheating.

Copy-protection schemes for the early systems were designed to defeat casual duplication attempts, as "crackers" would typically release a copied game to the "pirate" community the day they were earmarked for market.

A famous event in the history of software copyright policy was an open letter written by Bill Gates of Microsoft, dated February 3, 1976, in which he argued that the quality of available software would increase if "software piracy" were less prevalent. However, until the early 1990s, software copyright infringement was not yet considered a serious problem by most people. In 1992, the Software Publishers Association began to battle against this phenomenon, with its promotional video "Don't Copy That Floppy". It and the Business Software Alliance have remained the most active anti-infringement organizations worldwide, although to compensate for extensive growth in recent years, they have gained the assistance of the Recording Industry Association of America (RIAA), the Motion Picture Association of America (MPAA), as well as American Society of Composers, Authors, and Publishers (ASCAP) and Broadcast Music Incorporated (BMI).

Today most warez files are distributed to the public via bittorrent and One-click hosting sites. Some of the most popular software companies that are being targeted are Adobe, Microsoft, Nero, Apple, DreamWorks, and Autodesk, to name a few. To reduce the spread of illegal copying, some companies have hired people to release "fake" torrents (known as Torrent poisoning), which look real and are meant to be downloaded, but while downloading the individual does not realize that the company that owns the software has received their IP address. They will then contact their Internet service provider (ISP), and further legal action may be taken by the company/ISP.

=== Causes that have accelerated its growth ===
Similar to televisions and telephones, computers have become a necessity to every person in the information age. As the use of computers increased, so had software and cyber crimes.

In the mid-1990s, the average Internet user was still on dial-up, with average speed ranging between 28.8 and 33.6 kbit/s. If one wished to download a piece of software, which could run about 200 MB, the download time could be longer than one day, depending on network traffic, the ISP, and the server. Around 1997, broadband began to gain popularity due to its greatly increased network speeds. As "large-sized file transfer" problems became less severe, warez became more widespread and began to affect large software files like animations and movies.

In the past, files were distributed by point-to-point technology: with a central uploader distributing files to downloaders. With these systems, a large number of downloaders for a popular file uses an increasingly larger amount of bandwidth. If there are too many downloads, the server can become unavailable. The opposite is true for peer-to-peer networking; the more downloaders the faster the file distribution is. With swarming technology as implemented in file sharing systems like eDonkey2000 or BitTorrent, downloaders help the uploader by picking up some of its uploading responsibilities. There are many sites with links to One-click hosting websites and other sites where one can upload files that contribute to the growing amount of warez.

=== Distribution via compromised FTP servers ===
Prior to the development of modern peer-to-peer sharing systems and home broadband service, sharing warez sometimes involved warez groups scanning the Internet for weakly secured computer systems with high-speed connections. These weakly secured systems would be compromised by exploiting the poor FTP security, creating a special directory on the server with an unassuming name to contain the illegal content.

A common mistake of early FTP administrators was to permit a directory named /incoming that allows full read and write access by external users, but the files themselves in /incoming were hidden; by creating a directory inside /incoming, this hidden directory would then allow normal file viewing. Users of the compromised site would be directed to log in and go to a location such as /incoming/data/warez to find the warez content. Messages could be left for other warez users by uploading a plain text file with the message inside.

Hackers would also use known software bugs to illicitly gain full administrative remote control over a computer, and install a hidden FTP service to host their wares. This FTP service was usually running on an unusual port number, or with a non-anonymous login name like "login: warez / Password: warez" to help prevent discovery by legitimate users; information about this compromised system would then be distributed to a select group of people who were part of the warez scene.

It was important for warez group members to regulate who had access to these compromised FTP servers, to keep the network bandwidth usage low. A site that suddenly became very popular would be noticed by the real owners of the equipment, as their business systems became slow or low on disk space; investigation of system usage would then inevitably result in discovery and removal of the warez, and tightening of the site security.

=== Automated warez distribution via IRC bots ===
As the ability to compromise and attain full remote control of business servers became more developed, the warez groups would hack a server and install an IRC bot on the compromised systems alongside the FTP service, or the IRC bot would provide file sharing directly by itself. This software would intelligently regulate access to the illicit data by using file queues to limit bandwidth usage, or by only running during off-hours overnight when the business owning the compromised hardware was closed for the day.

In order to advertise the existence of the compromised site, the IRC software would join public IRC warez channels as a bot and post into the channel with occasional status messages every few minutes, providing information about how many people are logged into the warez host, how many files are currently being downloaded, what the upload/download ratio is (to force users into contributing data of their own before they can download), which warez distributor is running the bot, and other status information.

This functionality still exists and can still be found on IRC warez channels, as an alternative to the modern and streamlined P2P distribution systems. The opportunity to find and compromise poorly secured systems on which to create an illicit warez distribution site has only increased with the popular use of broadband service by home users who may not fully understand the security implications of having their home computer always turned on and connected to the Internet

== Types ==
There is generally a distinction made between different sub-types of warez. The unusual spellings shown here were commonly used as directory names within a compromised server, to organize the files rather than having them all thrown together in a single random collection.

- Apps – Applications: Generally a retail version of a software package.
- Cracks – Cracked applications: A modified executable or more (usually one) and/or a library (usually one) or more and/or a patch designed to turn a trial version of a software package into the full version and/or bypass copy protections.
- Dox – Video game add-ons: These include NoCDs, cracks, trainers, cheat codes etc.
- EBook – E-books: These include unlicensed copies of e-books, scanned books, scanned comics, etc.
- Games – Video games: This scene concentrates on both computer and console games, often released as ISO or other format disk image.
- Hacks – Simplified/Specific Hacking Tools: Programs designed to perform specific hacks at the click of a button, typically with a limited scope, such as AOHell and AOL4Free.
- Keygens – Keygen software are tools that replicate the registration/activation process of a genuine software product and generate the necessary keys to activate the software.
- Movies – Movies: Unauthorized copies of movies, can be released while still in theaters or from CDs/DVDs/Blu-ray prior to the actual retail date.
- MP3s – MP3 audio: Audio from albums, singles, or other sources usually obtained by ripping a CD or a radio broadcast and released in the compressed audio format MP3.
- MVs/MVids – Music videos – Can be ripped from TV, HDTV, DVDs or VCDs.
- NoCD, NoDVD, FixedExe – A file modification that allows an installed program to be run without inserting the CD or DVD into the drive.
- RIP – A game that doesn't have to be installed; any required registry entry can be included as a .reg file. RIP games can be ripped of music and/or video files, or, for video games, ROMs, thus decreasing the size of the download. RIPs with nothing ripped out sometimes are referred to as DP (direct play).
- Portables – Portable applications: Similar to RIPs, but in this case they're software applications instead of video games. The point of portable software is the fact that it can be placed on removable media (or any place on the local hard drive) and doesn't need installing; usually it is compressed into one executable file, by using software like VMware ThinApp or MoleBox.
- Scripts – Scripts: These include unlicensed copies of commercial scripts (such as vBulletin, Invision Power Board, etc.) coded by companies in PHP, ASP, and other languages.
- Subs – Subtitles: can be integrated in a TV-Rip or Movie.
- Serials – Refers to a collection of product keys such as serial numbers made available for the purpose of activating trial software, without payment.
- Templates – Web templates: These include leaked commercial website templates coded by companies.
- TV-Rips – Television programs: Television shows or movies, usually with commercials edited out. Commonly released within a few hours after airing. DVD Rips of television series fall under this sub-type.
- XXX – Pornography: These can be imagesets, paysite videos or retail movies.
- Zero-day or 0-day – Any copyrighted work that has been released the same day as the original product, or sometimes even before. It is considered a mark of skill among warez distribution groups to crack and distribute a program on the same day as its commercial release.

== Movie infringement ==
Movie copyright infringement was looked upon as impossible by the major studios. When dial-up was common in early and mid-1990s, movies distributed on the Internet tended to be small. The technique that was usually used to make them small was to use compression software, thus lowering the video quality significantly. At that time, the largest copyright violation threat was software.

However, along with the rise in broadband internet connections beginning around 1998, higher quality movies began to see widespread distribution – with the release of DeCSS, ISO images copied directly from the original DVDs were slowly becoming a feasible distribution method. Today, movie sharing has become so common that it has caused major concern amongst movie studios and their representative organizations. Because of this the MPAA is often running campaigns during movie trailers where it tries to discourage people from copying material without permission. Unlike the music industry, which has had online music stores available for several years, the movie industry moved to online distribution only in 2006, after the launch of Amazon Unbox.

Because of this, cameras are sometimes forbidden in movie theaters.

== File formats ==
A CD software release can contain up to 700 megabytes of data, which presented challenges when sending over the Internet, particularly in the late 1990s when broadband was unavailable to most home consumers. These challenges apply to an even greater extent for a single-layer DVD release, which can contain up to 4.7 GB of data. The warez scene made it standard practice to split releases up into many separate pieces, called disks, using several file compression formats: (historical TAR, LZH, ACE, UHA, ARJ), ZIP, and most commonly RAR. The original purpose of these "disks" was so that each .rar file could fit on a single 1.44 MB 3½ inch floppy disk. With the growing size of games, this is no longer feasible, as hundreds of disks would need to be used. The average size of disks released by groups today are 50 megabytes or 100 megabytes, however it is common to find disks up to 200 megabytes.

This method has many advantages over sending a single large file:

- The two-layer compression could sometimes achieve almost a tenfold improvement over the original DVD/CD image. The overall file size is cut down and lessens the transfer time and bandwidth required.
- If there is a problem during the file transfer and data was corrupted, it is only necessary to resend the few corrupted RAR files instead of resending the entire large file.
- This method also allows the possibility of downloading separate ‘disks’ from different sources, as an early attempt at modern segmented downloading.
  - In the case of One-click hosting websites, downloading multiple files from one or several sources can significantly increase download speeds. This is because even if the source(s) provides slow download speeds on individual disks, downloading several disks simultaneously will allow the user to achieve much greater download rates.

Despite the fact that many modern ftp programs support segmented downloading, the compression via RAR, ZIP, and breaking up of files has not changed.

Releases of software titles often come in two forms. The full form is a full version of a game or application, generally released as CD or DVD-writable disk images (BIN or ISO files). A rip is a cut-down version of the title in which additions included on the legitimate DVD/CD (generally PDF manuals, help files, tutorials, and audio/video media) are omitted. In a game rip, generally all game video is removed, and the audio is compressed to MP3 or Vorbis, which must then be decoded to its original form before playing. These rips are very rare today, as most modern broadband connections can easily handle the full files, and the audio is usually already compressed by the original producer in some fashion.

== Warez and malware ==
There is a common perception that warez sites represent high risk in terms of malware. In addition, there are several papers showing there is indeed correlation between warez/file sharing sites and malware. In particular, one study shows that out of all domains the study classified as pirate, 7.1% are infected (while out of random domains only 0.4% were infected); another study maintains that '"maliciousness" of the content for sites they classified as pirate (which specifically included warez sites) is the highest among all the researched site categories. Domains related to anti-copy protection tools are among the most malicious sites. Another study specifically targeted anti-copy protection tools such as cracks and key generators. They conclude that the majority of these programs aim to infect the user's computer with one or more types of malware. The chance of the end-user being exposed to malicious code when dealing with cracked applications or games is more than 50%.

Infected warez directly from the warez scene on the other hand, is a very unusual occurrence. The malicious content is usually added at a later stage by third parties.

== Demographics ==
Warez traders share many similarities to both hackers and crackers. Primary warez distribution groups include a single cracker that renders all copy protected technologies in a warez inoperable. Unlike the typical age of a hacker and cracker, the general age and demographics of a warez trader are older and married IT professionals. The need for attention is another similarity between the groups as well as the belief that digital property should be free.

== See also ==
- .nfo
- Crack introduction
- List of warez groups
- Online piracy
- Open Music Model
- Software copyright
