= Linger in Shadows =

2008 video game

- Developer: Plastic (Note: Additional work by Santa Monica Studio.)
- Publisher: Sony Computer Entertainment
- Designers: Michal Staniszewski, Marco Siegel, Wojciech Golczewski, Michal Witaszek, Krzysztof Deoniziak
- Composer: Wojciech Golczewski
- Engine: Pico Engine
- Platform: PlayStation 3
- Release: October 9, 2008
- Genre: Interactive art
- Mode: Single-player

Linger in Shadows is a 2008 interactive art video game developed by Polish demogroup Plastic and published by Sony Computer Entertainment for the PlayStation 3. It was first announced at Breakpoint 2008 in Germany.

Linger in Shadows differs in an important aspect from many demoscene products in that it was published by Sony on the PlayStation 3, who trademarked the name late 2007.

Many news-sites which reported about the demo assumed that it was a tech-demo for a future game. This was denied during presentations at E3, although it was revealed that the title does feature interactivity.

== Gameplay ==
A screen-capture from Linger in Shadows

The interactive parts were first showcased at the Realtime Generation festival in Vienna by lead programmer Michal "Bonzaj" Staniszewski; it was revealed that the interactive part of the demo is essentially the main storyline, with added interaction using the Sixaxis such as user-controlled camera and the ability to scratch back and forth in the timeline. It also allows the player to play around with some parts of the environment, like rotating certain objects or moving light-sources. The demo was later also presented at Nvision 08, in a somewhat updated state.

The interactive part initially only lets the user to explore the first fifth of the demo, and the user has to perform various actions with the Sixaxis to unlock the next part, such as shaking the controller or holding it in a certain angle. The scenes also feature hidden greetings to a number of known demogroups, which can be found in more obscure areas of the demo. Unlocking parts of the demo ("sigils") as well as finding hidden greetings both reward the user with trophies.

The demo also features an easter egg, unlockable in the menu by pressing down both analog sticks (L3 and R3) on the Sixaxis. The resulting menu item allows the viewer to watch an "oldskool demo" with a starfield, two DYCP scrollers (using the Amiga character set) and various other early demo effects such as blitter objects and metaballs (intentionally made to look low resolution), with chiptune music accompanying it.

== Reception ==
Reception

Aggregate score
Aggregator	Score
GameRankings	53.8%

Critical reactions to the project were polarized between two opinions: while some commended the unusual presentation and how the idea of interactive realtime art available on PSN is very much "outside the box", others claimed that the price was too expensive for a seven-minute experience, and that the controls were fiddly and not integral to the experience.

Game Chronicles called the visuals "stunning" and stated that it's "easily the best $3 you can spend in the PlayStation Store", giving it 96%. Gamestyle on the other hand, while commending that the demo is "breaking new ground", called it "overpriced".

== See also ==
- .detuned, a similar demoscene-originated interactive demo for the PlayStation 3
