= .kkrieger =

2004 shooter video game

- Developer: Farbrausch
- Platform: Microsoft Windows
- Release: 2004 (early access)
- Genre: First-person shooter
- Mode: Single player

.kkrieger (from Krieger, German for warrior) is a first-person shooter video game created by German demogroup .theprodukkt (a former subdivision of Farbrausch), which won first place in the 96k game competition at Breakpoint in April 2004. The game has never been fully released, remaining instead in the beta stage of development as of 2026, which renders it a perpetual beta.

== Development ==
.theprodukkt have developed .kkrieger since mid-2002, using their tool .werkkzeug (from Werkzeug, German for tool). They used an unreleased version of .werkkzeug called .werkkzeug3.

.kkrieger was created for the Breakpoint demo party in 2004. According to developer Fabian Giesen, the code was initially designed with file size in mind by "making it modular, using the right algorithms, storing data in the right way, and so on." The team then removed unused parts of the code and used assembly language for further size reduction. When .kkrieger became playable, it weighed in at 120 KiB and was subsequently shrunk down to 102 KiB. The team then coded their own code analyzer and parsed through the code to ensure maximum efficiency and eliminate the remaining wasted space.

The source code of both the .werkkzeug3 engine and the game itself was released by the group in 2012, either under the 2-clause BSD license or as public domain.

=== Procedural content ===
.kkrieger gameplay

.kkrieger makes extensive use of procedural generation methods. Textures are stored via their creation history instead of a per-pixel basis, thus only requiring the history data and the generator code to be compiled into the executable, producing a relatively small file size. Meshes are created from basic solids such as boxes and cylinders, which are then deformed to achieve the desired shape—essentially a special way of box modeling. These two-generation processes account for the extensive loading time of the game; all assets of the gameplay are reproduced during the loading phase.

The entire game uses only 97,280 bytes of disk space. In contrast, most contemporaneous first-person shooters filled one or more CDs or DVDs. According to the developers, .kkrieger itself would take up around 200–300 MB of space if it had been stored the conventional way.

The game music and sounds are produced by a multifunctional synthesizer called V2, which is fed a continuous stream of MIDI data. The synthesizer then produces the music in real time.

== Reception ==
The game won first place in the Breakpoint competition as well as two German game developer prizes at the Deutscher Entwicklerpreis in 2006, in Innovation and Advancement.

Gaming website Acid-Play gave the game 2/5 stars and a mixed review, mainly praising the game's file size, calling it "not a featureless game, but one whose limitations break barriers in terms of what can be done" and ultimately stating that "you'll never find a game which has this much and comes in such a small package."

== See also ==
- Demoscene
