= Phenomena (demogroup) =

Phenomena (PHA) was a Swedish Demogroup making Amiga demos that was productive during the formative years of the Amiga Demoscene founded in 1987.

Logo for the Amiga demogroup Phenomena

== Origins ==
Phenomena was founded by members of Triangle which was a 3 group co-operation between Crack Force Five, Jetspeed, and The Gang. Specifically, the founding members were Avalon and Silmarillion in early 1987, and members from these three groups joined during late 1987 and 1988.

A pure demogroup from the start (as distinct from groups that started out cracking Amiga games), in April 1988 Phenomena released their first demo, The Star Flight, one of the early demos featuring Soundtracker music and the to-be staple effect of demos, the horizontal starfield effect.

== The productive years ==
In 1989, the member count of Phenomena exploded to where it might grow hard to organize. Among the new members were Megaman, Terminator, and Firefox, who would later work in the Amiga games industry as developer, graphics artist, and musician for major Amiga game developers. But once organized, this also resulted in a high production output with releases climbing the charts such as Phenomena Megademo, which won the Equinox and Horizon Party and was featured on season 1, episode 4 of the Swedish TV program, Bit för Bit.

Throughout 1989 and in the years that followed, Phenomena released many chart-toppers. One of the reasons for its growing success in Scandinavia, France, Germany and the UK can be attributed to a high release tempo. They achieved this with its large member count, with an unusually high ratio of coders (demo programmers) for any demogroup, and a fanbase growing around the output of Phenomena's productive musician, Firefox. But it also required swappers that were on the game, to make sure the demos spread across Europe together with the latest cracks and demo collections. This Phenomena had from the outset in the members from the forming groups.

== Demoparties ==
Phenomena also helped organize Demoparties yearly from 1990 to 1993.

== Competition wins ==
List of winning entries in demoparty demo competitions, in chronological order:

- Phenomena Megademo, 1st at Equinox and Horizon Party 1989
- Vectormania, 1st at Amiga Halloween Conference 1990
- Animotion, 1st at Dexion X-Mas Conference 1990
- Enigma, 1st at Anarchy Easter Party 1991
