= .detuned =

2009 video game

- Developer(s): .theprodukkt (Note: Additional work by Santa Monica Studio.)
- Publisher(s): Sony Computer Entertainment
- Designer(s): Christoph Mütze
- Composer(s): Leonard Ritter
- Platform(s): PlayStation 3
- Release: JP: September 17, 2009; WW: October 15, 2009
- Genre(s): Interactive art
- Mode(s): Single-player

.detuned is a 2009 interactive art video game developed by German demogroup .theprodukkt and published by Sony Computer Entertainment for the PlayStation 3. It was initially released on September 17, 2009, in Japan as .detuned: Gumi Senpai no Fushigi Kūkan (デチューンド グミ先輩の不思議空間, Dichūndo Gumi Senpai no Fushigi Kūkan, lit. ".detuned: The Mysterious Space of Senior Gumi"), and on October 15 worldwide. It is the second demo released on the PlayStation 3 after Linger in Shadows.

== Gameplay ==
.detuned features a man sitting in a chair surrounded by a psychedelic environment. The player can switch into various modes, and using the trigger buttons and right analogue stick, apply certain effects on the man, which e.g. make his head shrink or apply a post-processing filter on the visuals and music. The player is also able to load their own music in.

== Reception ==
Reception

Aggregate score
Aggregator	Score
Metacritic	46/100

Review scores
Publication	Score
GamesMaster	50%
IGN	4/10
Play	50%
PSM3	42%

The game received "generally unfavorable reviews" according to the review aggregation website Metacritic, earning an average score of 46/100.

Many critics were united in the extremely short length of the game. IGN cited the lack of lasting appeal as the biggest problem about .detuned, saying that "selling for $2.99 in the US PlayStation Store, that's about a dollar per minute of entertainment".
