= The Lords =

The Lords may refer to:

- The British House of Lords
- The Lords (German band), German beat group
- The Lords, band from Las Vegas with Fred Cole
- The Lords (demogroup), a Dutch group of programmers

== See also ==
- The Lord (disambiguation)
