= TRSI =

TRSI may refer to:

- Tristar and Red Sector Incorporated, a demogroup
- The Right Stuf International, an anime- and manga-related retailer
