= The Judges (demogroup) =

The Judges was a Dutch Commodore 64 group from Roosendaal known for being one of the earliest dedicated demogroups. The Judges released several demos for the Commodore 64 home computer between the years 1986 - 1988. Groups such as The Judges are regarded as early pioneers of what came to be known as the demoscene.

In some respects they mirrored The Lords, a "rivaling" ZX Spectrum group also from Roosendaal, to the extent that concepts, artwork and even titles were identical between the two groups.

A technical milestone often attributed to The Judges, particularly the programmer Bart "White" Meeuwissen, is the invention of the FLD (Flexible Line Distance) technique, which was used in the Think Twice series of demos. As the name implies, FLD made it possible to have a variable distance every eight pixels between the individual text or graphics lines generated by the VIC-II video chip.

The group's musician Jeroen "Red" Kimmel went on to compose and sell video game music commercially for different platforms such as the C64, Amiga and MSX computers.

== Members ==
- Jeroen "Red" Kimmel
- Bart "White" Meeuwissen
- Hans "Der Hansie" van Gink
- Corne "Coko" Koen

== Releases ==
- Think Twice series (parts 1–5, released in 1987 and 1988)
- Crazy Sample 1 & 2
- Hubbard Track series (parts 1–3)
- Rhaa Lovely 1 & 2
- Touch Me
- Jugglin' Judge
- Rascal
- Mikie's Music
- It's a Kind of Magic
- Phantom of the Asteroid Music
