= The Lords (demogroup) =

Computer art group

Screenshot from Tetris for the SAM Coupé

Screenshot from Bats 'n Balls for the SAM Coupé

The Lords was a Dutch ZX Spectrum group from Roosendaal known as one of the earliest dedicated demogroups. The Lords released several demos for the ZX Spectrum home computer between the years 1986 and 1990. Groups such as The Lords are regarded as early pioneers of what came to be known as the demoscene. They were especially noted for their sound-chip skills.

In some respects they mirrored The Judges, a "rivaling" Commodore 64 group also from Roosendaal, to the extent that concepts, artwork and even titles were identical between the two groups.

Their demo Quinquagesima was given a review of 78% in the September 1992 issue of Your Sinclair - three years after it was released in 1989. Some of their productions was put as covermounts, for instance The Apple Movie on Outlet issue 107 and Quinquagesima on Outlet issue 070.

In later years, they released some of their demos for the SAM Coupé and two games: a freeware version of Tetris in 1990 (also published as a covermount on Fred issue 3) and an Arkanoid clone named Batz 'n Balls in 1992, both to very good reviews.

In 1994 two of the members, Lord Insanity and Scrunk, did a series of articles about demos for the paper-based magazine ZAT.

== Members ==
- Lord Insanity (David Gommeren)
- Scrunk (Rob Mies)
- Thing (Michiel Koolen)
- Zoinks (Eric Damstra)
