= Chaos Theory (demo) =

2006 computer demo by Conspiracy

Chaos Theory is a computer demo by Conspiracy released in August 2006 at Assembly. It has been realised by Gergely Szelei, Barna Buza and Zoltán Szabó.

== Technical description ==
Chaos Theory is a 64K intro demo. It uses kkrunchy from farbrausch as packer.

== Synopsis ==
The demo opens with three circles and a black screen. On a green foliage pattern screen the words "Conspiracy", "Assembly 2006" appear, before showing a space opera scene with "a world not of my making yet a world of my design, so strange and so familiar" text. After a quiet moment, the rhythm of the music and the speed of the graphisms accelerates, to represent chaos. A device with imbricated rings moving up and down appears briefly. Then, the demo decreases again to a more quiet pace, prints geometry patterns before a second acceleration and a repeat of the previous patterns and elements, slightly different.

== Awards ==
The demo was very well received by critics. It was ranked second place at the Assembly 2006. Since, it has received several awards, like an honorary mention in the Prix Ars Electronica's Computer Animation / Film / VFX category in 2007. At Scene.org Awards, it won the best 64K intro prize, and was also nominated in the "Best Direction" and "Public Choice" categories. It was also presented at SIGGRAPH in 2007.
