= Welle:Erdball =

German band

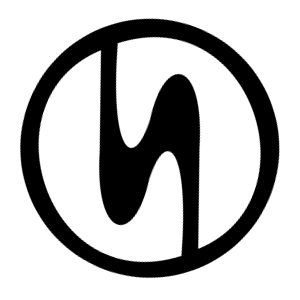
Welle:Erdball

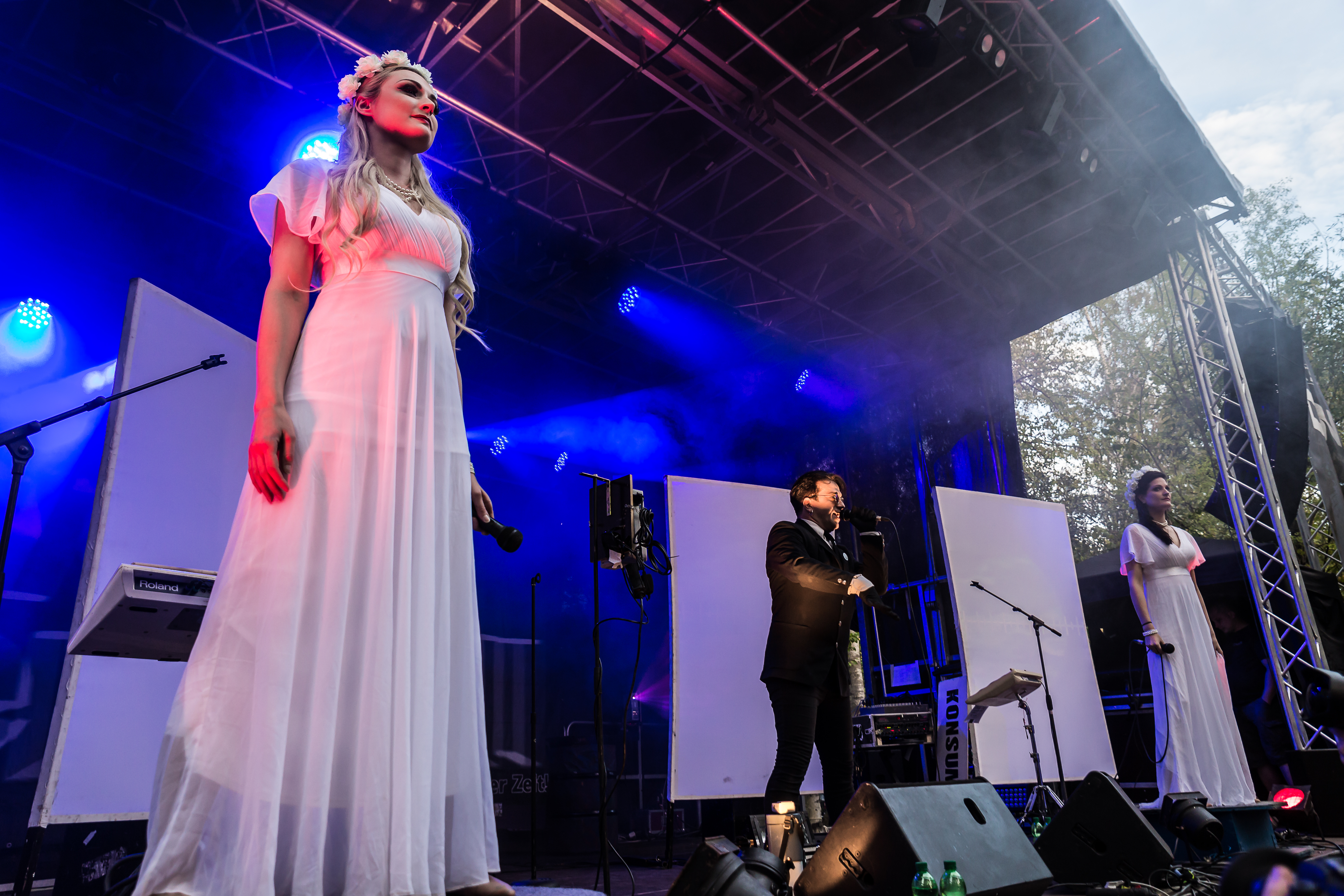
- Welle:Erdball performing at the 2018 Nocturnal Culture Night in Germany

Background information
- Also known as: Honigmond; Feindsender 64.3
- Origin: Stadthagen, Germany
- Genres: Bitpop, synth-pop, electronic
- Years active: 1990–present
- Label: SPV
- Members: Hannes "Honey" Malecki; MissMoonlight; M.A. Peel c0zmo
- Past members: Alf "A.L.F." Behnsen; Fräulein Venus; Lady Lila; Fräulein Plastique; Zara; Soraya.vc; KayCat; Xenia G.
- Website: www.welle-erdball.info

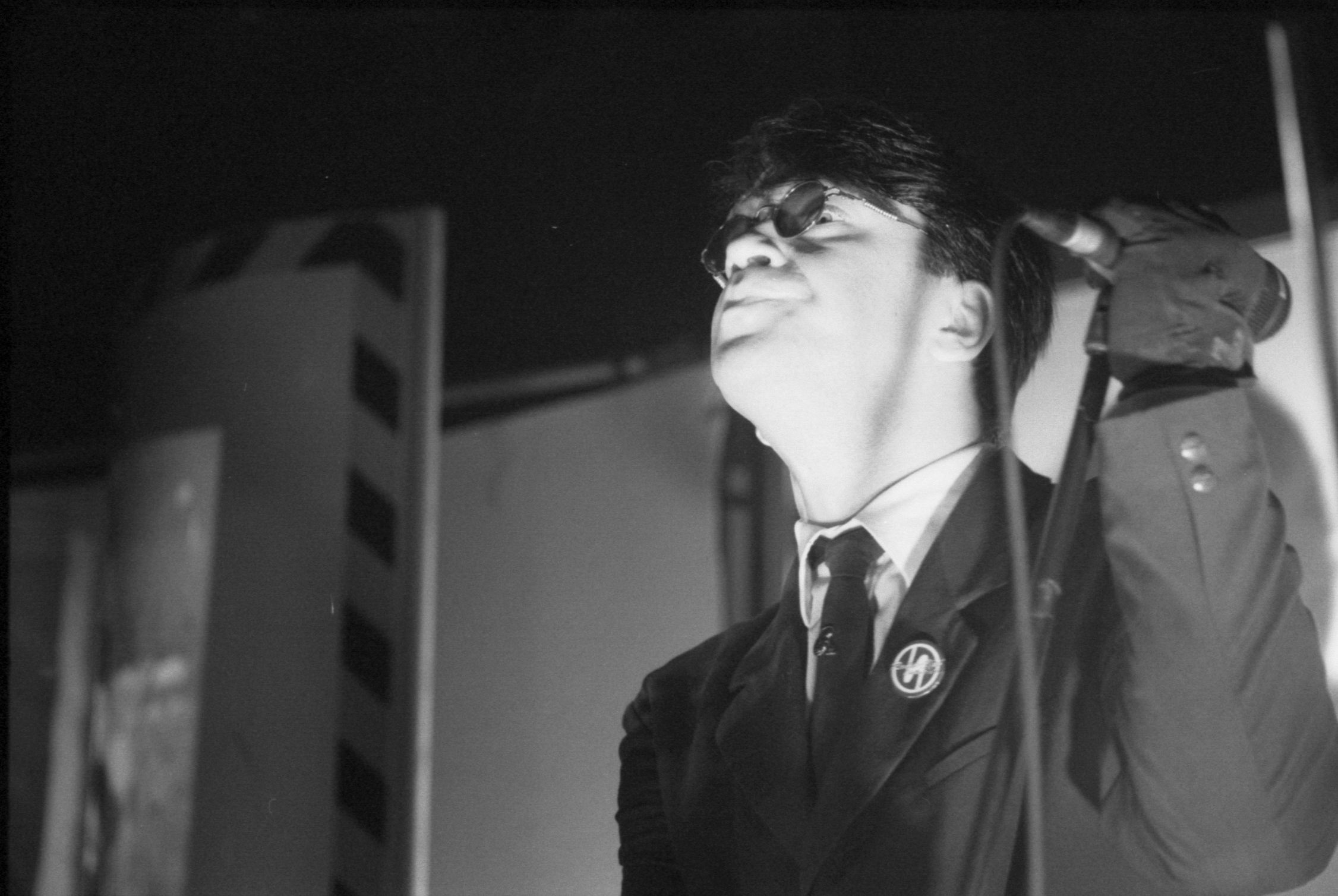
Welle:Erdball performing in Zurich in December 2008

Welle:Erdball (often abbreviated as W:E) is a German band whose sound is distinguished by their intensive use of the Commodore 64's SID sound chip.

The band name literally means "Wave:Earthball" or "Wave:Globe" and is inspired by a Weimar republican radio play titled "Hallo! Hier Welle Erdball!". The band's logo displays a rotated version of the Eastern German motor company VEB Sachsenring, the former producer the world-famous Trabant car.

Welle:Erdball have been part of the demoscene and produced several musicdisks as well as other formats over the years. They have also performed live at the Breakpoint 2006.

In addition to his work as Welle:Erdball, Honey was involved in the project called "Das Präparat" from 2003 to 2005. Honey (a.k.a. Dr. Georg Linde) and "Plastique" have launched a side project called "homo~futura".

== Members ==
- Hannes "Honey" Malecki - lyrics, vocals (1990-)
- MissMoonlight - percussion, vocals (2019-)
- M.A. Peel - percussion, vocals (2019-)
- c0zmo - music, programming (2019-)

=== Former members ===
- Isa - Vocals, Tones (1993-1995)
- Xenia G-punkt – Vocals, Percussion (1995-1999)
- KayCat – Percussion (2000–2002)
- Soraya.vc – Vocals, Percussion (2000–2004)
- Zara – Percussion (2004–2005)
- Fräulein Plastique - Vocals, percussion (2005-2013)
- Alf "A.L.F." Behnsen - music, programming (1990-2019)
- Fräulein Venus - percussion, vocals (2003-2019)
- Lady Lila - percussion, vocals (2013-2019)

=== Gallery ===
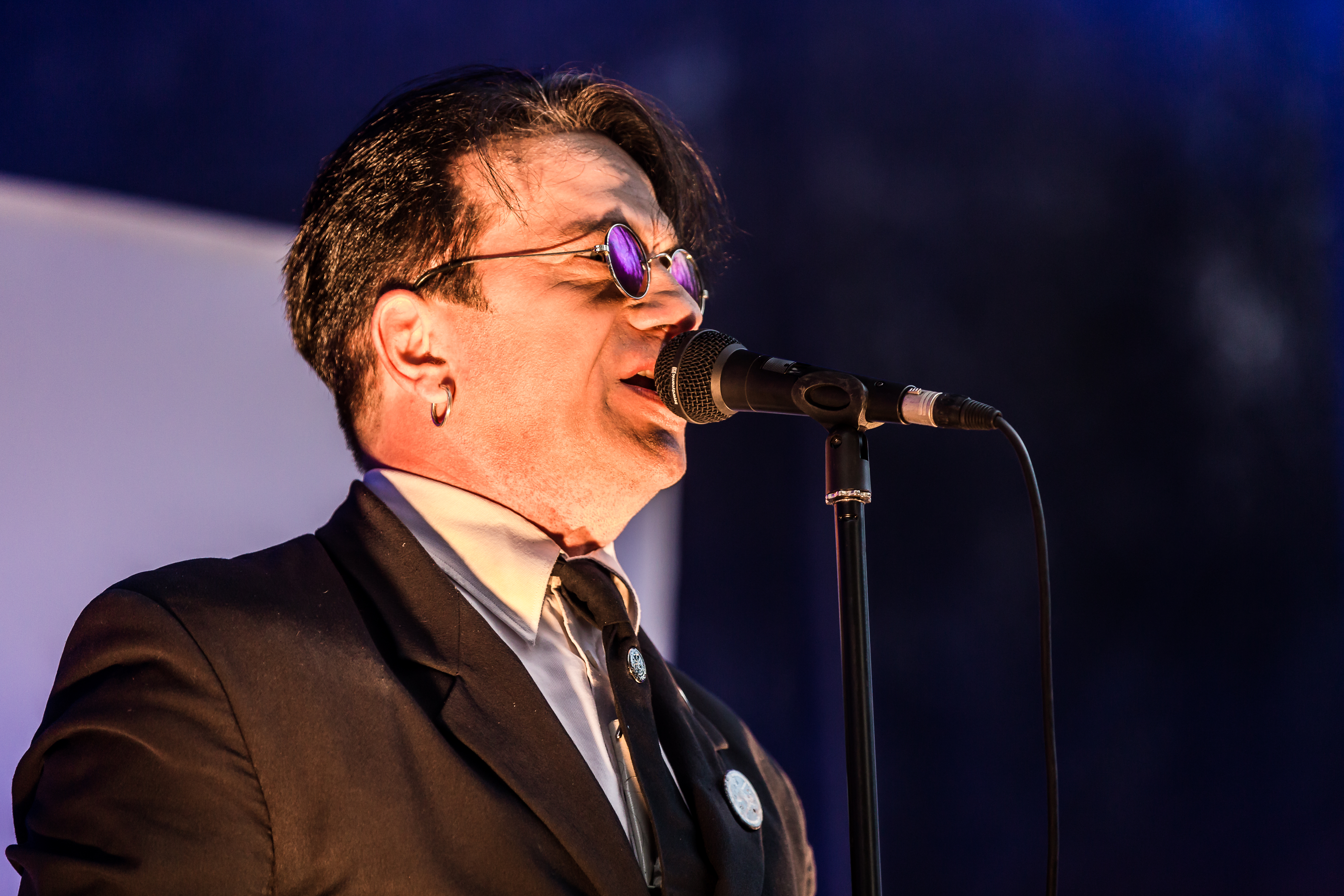
Hannes "Honey" Malecki
lyrics, vocals

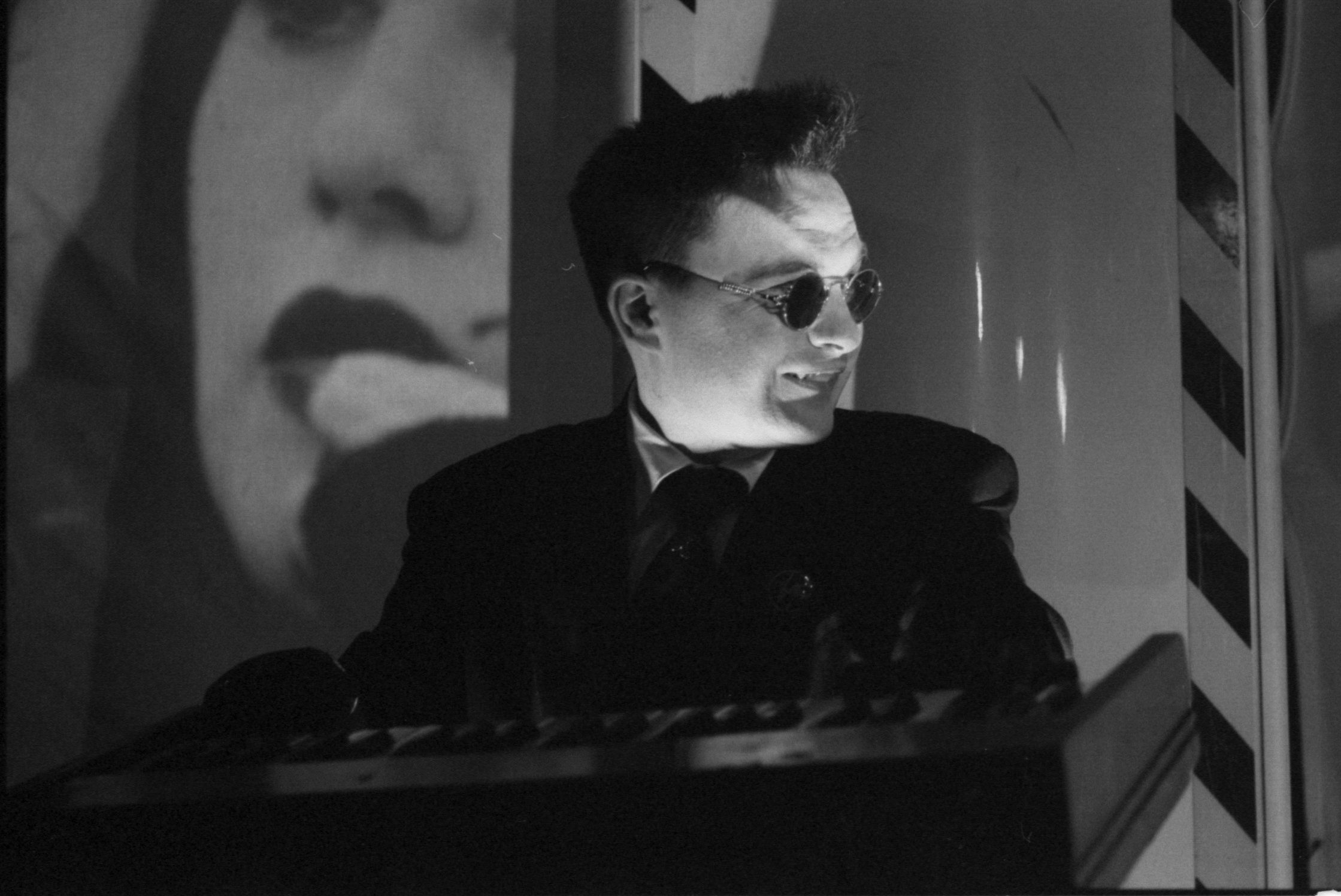
Alf "A.L.F." Behnsen (1990-2019)
music, programming

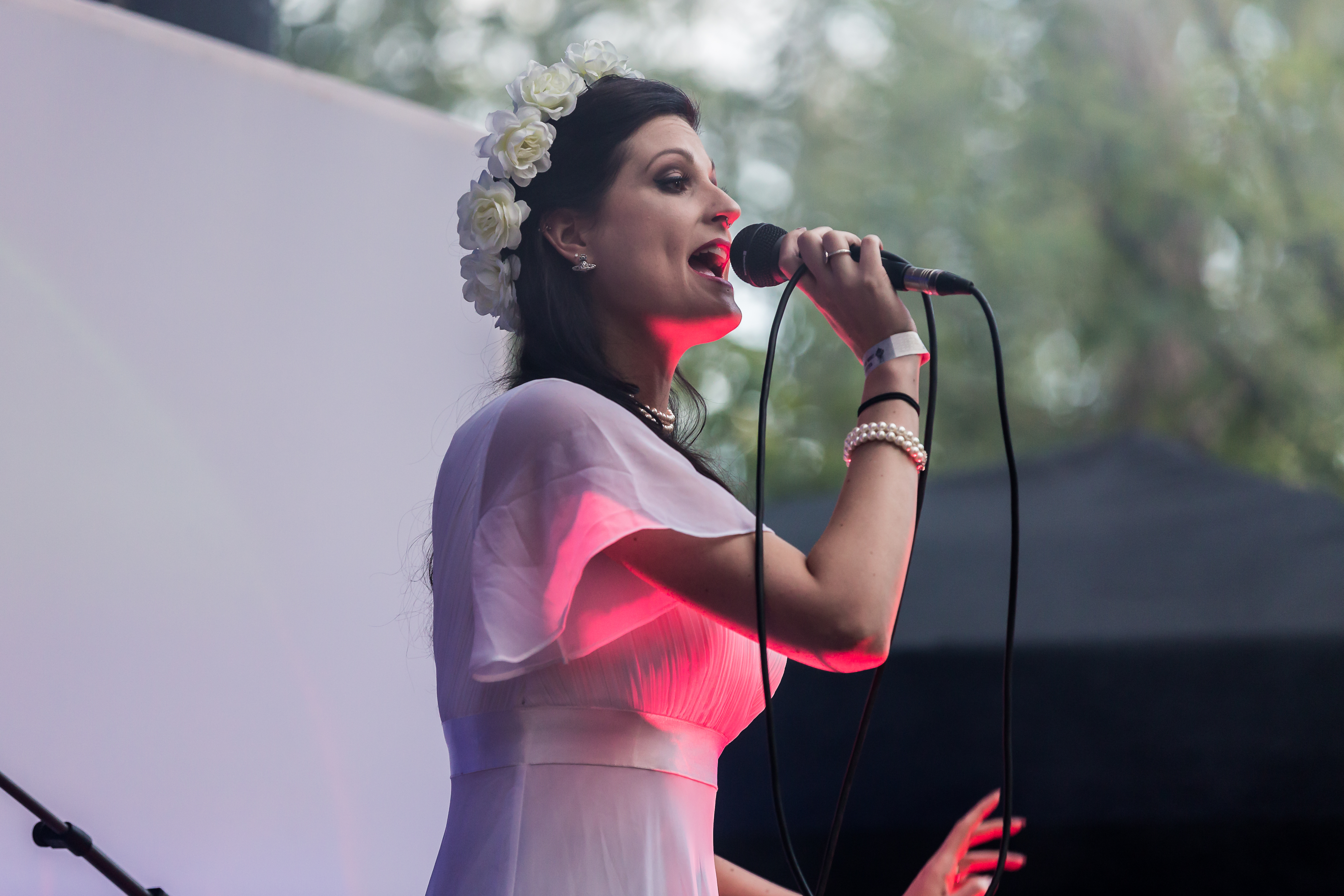
Frl. Venus (2003-2019)
percussion, vocals

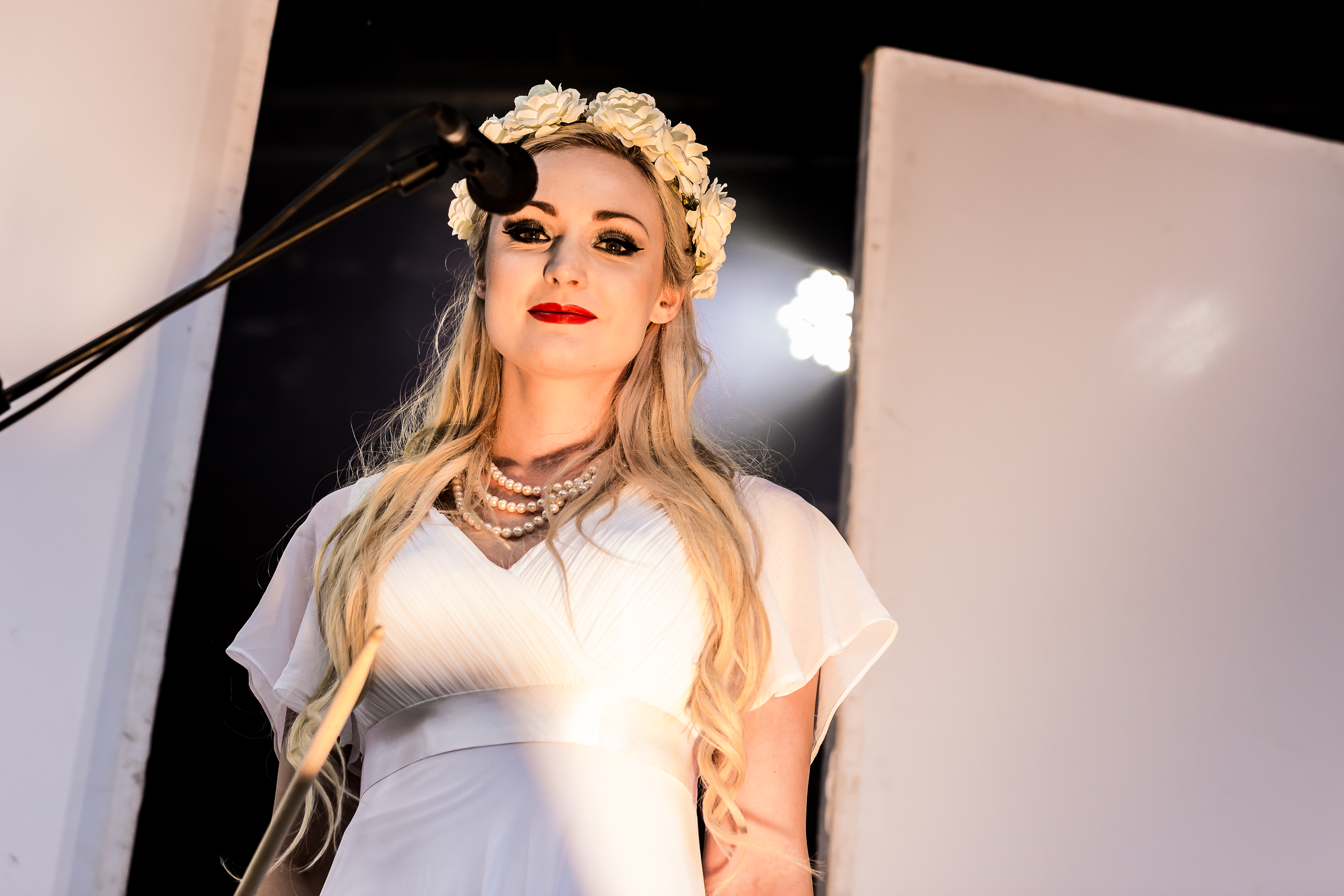
Lady Lila (2013-2019)
percussion, vocals

== Discography ==
=== Albums ===
- Der Sinn des Lebens (The meaning of life, 1992 as Honigmond)
- Es ist an der Zeit (It is about time, 1993)
- Frontalaufprall (Head-on impact, 1994)
- Alles ist möglich (Everything is possible, 1995)
- Tanzpalast 2000 (Dancing palace 2000, 1996)
- Der Sinn des Lebens (The meaning of life, 1998)
- Horizonterweiterungen (Expansion of the horizon, only Vinyl 12", 2004)
- Die Wunderwelt der Technik (The wonderworld of technology, CD 2002 / Vinyl 12", 2005)
- Chaos Total (CD 2006 / Picture-Vinyl 12", 2009)
- Cmdr. Laserstrahl (radio play, 2009)
- Operation: Zeitsturm (2010)
- Der Kalte Krieg (The Cold War, 2011)
- Tanzmusik für Roboter (Dance Music for Robots, 2014)
- Gaudeamus Igitur (2017)
- Film, Funk und Fernsehen (2022)

=== Singles and EPs ===
- Nyntändo-Schock (Nyntändo-Shock, 1993)
- W.O.L.F. (1995)
- Telephon W-38 (1996)
- Deine Augen / Arbeit Adelt! (Your eyes / Work ennobles!, 1998)
- Starfighter F-104G (2000)
- VW-Käfer & 1000 Tage (VW Käfer and 1000 days, 2001)
- Super 8 (2001)
- Nur tote Frauen sind schön (Only dead women are beautiful, 2003)
- Ich bin aus Plastik – Vinyl (2008)
- Ich bin aus Plastik – CD (With extra tracks than Vinyl) (2008)
- Die Singles 1993–2010 – 10 cd box (2010)
- Computerklang (Computer Sound) (2013)
- Ich rette dich (I will save you) (2014)
- 1000 Engel (1000 angels) (2015)
- Die Menschen sterben nicht (People do not die) (2025)

=== DVD ===
- Operation: Zeitsturm Movie-DVD (2010)
- Der Kalte Krieg Live-DVD (2011)

== Solo- or Sideprojects ==
- The Screeching MiEW (1994, Honey and Xenia G.)

1994: Awakening of the Animals (Cassette album, 2003 Re-release of song Speak for the Future on the W:E EP Nur tote Frauen sind schön)

- Das Präparat (2003 to 2005 Honey)

2004: Tanz' mit Deinem Gefühl (MCD)

- homo~futura (2005, Honey [alias Dr. Georg Linde], Plastique, K. Gross und F. Enstein)

2011: Der Neue Mensch

- The Girl & The Robot (2009, Plastique and Deadbeat)

2010: The Beauty of Decay
2011: Silence ⋆ Borderline (EP)

- Die Funkhausgruppe (Welle:Erdball, Die Perlen, Sonnenbrandt and Hertzinfarkt)

2011: Mono-Poly
