= Burkov =

Burkov (Russian: Бурков) is a Russian male surname, its feminine counterpart is Burkova (Russian: Буркова). Notable people with the surname include:

- Alexander Burkov (born 1967), Russian politician
- Dmitry Burkov (born 1960), Russian Internet entrepreneur and businessman
- Georgi Burkov (1933–1990), Russian film actor
- Vladimir Burkov (1939–2025), Russian control theorist and author
