= Farbrausch =

Demogroup

Farbrausch, or Farb-rausch, is a German group of demomakers.

== Group ==
The group became well known in the demoscene in December 2000 with a 64k intro called "fr-08: .the .product". The demo achieved its small size through the use of procedural textures, a custom MIDI-based software synthesizer V2 (controlled through a sequencer called Logic Audio), and a modified version of UPX executable compressor, ".the .product" is an 11-minute 3-D show featuring complex scenes of computer generated imagery.

The name "Farbrausch" translates literally to "color rush", where rush means variously "intoxication, drunkenness, high, ecstasy, and state of euphoria." This serves as a core theme across the otherwise multifaceted topics in Farbrausch demos, which cover futuristic or abstract technology, dystopian cityscapes and even quantum mechanics.

Their work has won numerous awards. In 2004, a subdivision of farbrausch called ".theprodukkt" released a 96 kB first-person shooter game named .kkrieger, and an earlier version of the tool they currently use to produce some of their demos, named ".werkkzeug", or "Tool".

Farbrausch give their releases a "product code", in the format "fr-0#". The numbers do not specify the order of release — the members have stated that they allocate the numbers as they start working on the project, not when they finish it. Non-serious releases receive negative numbers.

The group has periodically released improved compositions such as "fr-019: Poem to a Horse", "fr-030: Candytron" or "fr-025: The.Popular.Demo". The.Popular.Demo and debris. are among the most highly favored demos on the demoscene index, Pouet. The.Popular.Demo also received the "Public Choice Award" from the 2003 scene.org awards, and debris. won the 2007 scene.org award for best direction.

In 2009, Farbrausch released .detuned, an interactive demo for the PlayStation 3, again under the name .theprodukkt.

In 2012 Farbrausch released the source code of many of their demo tools on GitHub.

== Notable demo releases and awards ==
Title	Type	Awards
fr-05: Konsum	demo	2nd place at Evoke 2000
fr-06: Black 2000	demo	1st place at Dialogos 2000
fr-08: .the .product (a.k.a. The Product)	64kB intro	1st place at The Party 2000
fr-010: Art (in cooperation with Scoopex)	64kB intro	1st place at Mekka & Symposium 2001
fr-011: ms2001 invitation	64kB intro	1st place at Mekka & Symposium 2001
fr-012: kapital	demo	4th at Mekka & Symposium 2001
fr-013: Flybye	invitation intro	for The Party 2001
fr-018: AGB	GBA demo	1st place at Woest 2002 (wild demo)
fr-019: Poem to a Horse	64kB intro	1st place at Mekka & Symposium 2002, scene.org award nominee - best intro & best effects of 2002; the first demoscene production to be shown at SIGGRAPH
fr-020: In Control	demo	3rd place at Mekka & Symposium 2002
fr-022: Ein.Schlag	64kB intro	2nd place at Mekka & Symposium 2002
fr-029: Dopplerdefekt	64kB intro	1st place at The Ultimate Meeting 2002, scene.org award nominee - most original concept of 2002
fr-024: Welcome to...	64kB intro	2nd place at 0a000h 2003
fr-025: The.Popular.Demo	demo	1st place at Breakpoint 2003, scene.org award winner - public's choice of 2003, nominee - best effects, best demo, & best soundtrack of 2003
fr-030: Candytron	64kB intro	2nd place at Breakpoint 2003, scene.org award winner - best intro of 2003
fr-031: Faded Memories	demo	12th place at Assembly 2003, scene.org award nominee - best graphics of 2003
fr-034: Time Index (in cooperation with Haujobb)	64kB intro	2nd place at Simulaatio 2003, scene.org award nominee - best intro of 2003
fr-036: Zeitmaschine	demo	1st place at The Ultimate Meeting 2003
fr-037: The Code Inside (in cooperation with mfx)	invitation demo	for Breakpoint 2004
fr-038: Theta	demo	2nd place at The Ultimate Meeting 2004
fr-039: Collage Faction	wild demo	2nd place at Breakpoint 2004
fr-040	pc 4k	8th place at Breakpoint 2004
fr-044: Patient Zero	64kB intro	1st place at Simulaatio 2005
fr-045: Life After	demo	11th place at Breakpoint 2005
fr-046: Basso Continuo	demo	4th place at Evoke 2005
fr-048: Precision	64kB intro	4th place at Assembly 2006
fr-049: Of Spirits Taken	invitation demo	for Breakpoint 2006
fr-052: Platinum	64kB intro	1st place at The Ultimate Meeting 2006
fr-041: debris.	demo	1st place at Breakpoint 2007, scene.org award winner - best direction of 2007, nominee - best demo, best effects, public choice of 2007
fr-055: 828	demo	1st place at Icons 2007
fr-043: rove	demo	2nd place at Breakpoint 2010
fr-063: Magellan	demo	1st place at The Ultimate Meeting 2010
