= Amiga demos =

Set of demos for the Amiga home computer

Amiga demos are demos created for the Amiga home computer.

A "demo" is a demonstration of the multimedia capabilities of a computer (or more to the point, a demonstration of the skill of the demo's constructors). There was intense rivalry during the 1990s among the best programmers, graphic artists and computer musicians to continually outdo each other's demos. Since the Amiga's hardware was more or less fixed (unlike today's PC industry, where arbitrary combinations of hardware can be put together), there was competition to test the limits of that hardware and perform theoretically "impossible" feats by refactoring the problem at hand. In Europe the Amiga was the undisputed leader of mainstream multimedia computing in the late 1980s and early 1990s, though it was eventually overtaken by PC architecture.

Some Amiga demos, such as the RSI Megademo, Kefrens Megademo VIII or Crionics & The Silents "Hardwired" are considered seminal works in the demo field. New Amiga demos are released even today, although the demo scene has firmly moved onto PC hardware. Many Amiga game developers were active in the demo scene.

The demo scene spearheaded development in multimedia programming techniques for the Amiga, such that it was de rigueur for the latest visual tricks, soundtrackers and 3D algorithms from the demo scene to end up being used in computer game development.

== Demo software ==
Most demos were written in 68000 assembly language, although a few were written in C and other languages. To utilize full hardware performance, Amiga demos were optimized and written entirely for one purpose in assembly (avoiding generic and portable code). Additional performance was achieved by utilizing several coprocessors, including a blitter, in parallel with the 68000. Most demos bypassed the operating system and addressed the hardware directly.

First bigger demos were released in 1987, one of them was "Tech Tech" by Sodan & Magician 42, it was released in November 1987 and is considered a classic by many.

Eric Schwartz produced a series of animated demos that ran with MoviePlayer, an animation software package similar to Toon Boom. The animated demos drew heavily on the whimsy and graphic style of comic strips.

Red Sector Incorporated produced a piece of software called the RSI Demomaker, which allowed users to script their own demos, replete with scrolltext, vectorballs, plasma screens, etc.

Full demos range from under 128 KB to several megabytes. There have been several thousand demos produced in many countries. Some active demo countries were Denmark, Finland, Germany, Italy, the Netherlands, Norway, Sweden, UK, Poland and others.

== Intros ==
Smaller demos are often known as intros. They are typically limited to between 4 and 64KB in size. Intros were originally used as tags by cracking groups on computer games and other software. The purpose of the intro was to advertise cracking and distribution skill of a particular group. Later it developed into a stand-alone art form. Many demo and intro groups disassociated themselves from the cracking and copying scene, although the same people could still be involved in it.

== Ripping ==
The Amiga thrived on public domain, freeware and other not-for-profit development. The architecture provided no substantial mechanism for protecting software from inspection. In order to read the memory one simply performed a hot reset (which preserved the contents of RAM) and then booted to a dedicated floppy disk that could inspect and dump the memory's contents. It was therefore common for developers and hackers to "rip" music, graphics and code and then reuse it in their own productions. This led to intense competition in certain fields, for example, in the development of sound tracking software and Tetris clones, with each group of developers trying to outdo the current state of the art. In fact, some demos even featured their source code as part of the executable to save hackers the trouble of disassembly, though it came strewn with incendiary comments for those who would seek to improve on it.

== Amiga demo groups ==
- Equinox
- Fairlight / Virtual Dreams
- Phenomena
- Tristar and Red Sector Incorporated
