= Scene.org =

Demoscene file repository

- Website: www.scene.org

Scene.org (also known as The International Scene Organization) is a non-profit organization, providing the currently largest demoscene file repository. It was founded in 1996 by Jaakko "Mellow-D" Manninen, though originally it existed as ftp.fm.org, an FTP-server for releases from the group Five Musicians. In 1997, it re-opened as Scene.org. After the Hornet Archive closed on September 22, 1998, scene.org became the only prominent demoscene-FTP available and quickly became the host of many other releases as well.

The Scene.org servers are hosted in Rotterdam, at the local university. They measure 150-200 GB of traffic each day (as of May 2006) and host about 1.1 TB of demoscene-related data (as of June 2013). The main server is mirrored onto various others, residing in different countries. As of 2009, it was sponsored by, among others, Pixar.

== Awards ==
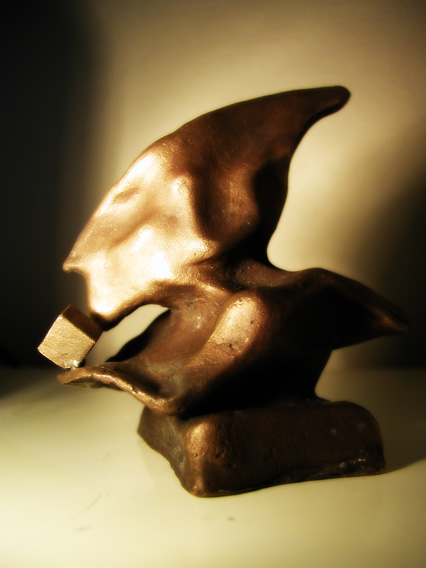
Scene.org Award statue

In 2003, Scene.org established the Scene.org Awards, given annually to the creators of the best demos or intros that year. The winners (except for the Public's Choice category) were selected by a jury, consisting of acclaimed sceners from all around the globe. The awarding ceremony was traditionally held at the Breakpoint demo party., however on the first of September 2010, it was announced that the 2011 award would be held at The Gathering. The Scene.org Awards project however ended at Assembly in 2012.

== Categories ==
The awards hosted the following categories:

- Best Demo
- Best 64K Intro
- Best 4K Intro (from 2004)
- Best Effects
- Best Graphics
- Best Soundtrack
- Best Direction
- Most Original Concept
- Breakthrough Performance
- Best Technical Achievement (from 2009)
- Public's Choice (from 2004)
- Best Demo on an Oldschool Platform (from 2005)

== Winners and nominations ==
Note: The year signifies the release year of the productions - the ceremony is always held during the following year.

keWlers and Moppi are tied for the most awards won with four each. The most nominated firm is keWlers with 19 total nominations. mfx is the only group with at least one nomination in every year, as of 2006.

Planet Risk and Lifeforce, both by Andromeda Software Development, are the only demos so far that have won the Best Demo and Public's Choice at the same time.

=== 2006 ===
==== Best Demo ====
- Track One by Fairlight
- Deities by mfx
- Five Finger Discount by Shitfaced Clowns
- STS-02: Electric Kool-Aid by Synesthetics
- Starstruck by The Black Lotus

==== Best 64k Intro ====
- Chaos Theory by Conspiracy
- Memento by Conspiracy
- Dead Ringer by Fairlight
- Meet The Family by Fairlight
- Aesterozoa by keWlers

==== Best 4k Intro ====
- Glitterati by Fairlight
- Parazonantikum by Calodox
- Polarfield by Fuzzion
- miChinygma by Limp Ninja
- Artefacts by Plush

==== Best Animation ====
- Unclear Throat by Pluisje
- Surprise (Egon and Dönci - Last man on Earth!?) by Aenima
- Lloco by Exceed
- Of Mice and Monsters by Junk
- The Tits Have Escaped by Pluisje

==== Best Demo on an Oldskool Platform ====
- Error 23 by Resource & The Dreams
- Old Skool Invitro Maker - Sundown 06 Invite by Ate Bit
- Trans*Form by Focus
- The Wild Bunch by Instinct, Triad, Horizon & Focus
- Artefacts by Plush

==== Best Effects ====
- The Evolution of Vision by Andromeda Software Development
- Track One by Fairlight
- Liquid Lust by Fairlight
- Deities by MFX
- Five Finger Discount by Shitfaced Clowns

==== Best Graphics ====
- Starstruck by The Black Lotus
- Project 2501 by ADDiCT
- Lux Aeterna Luceat Eis by Ephidrena
- Track One by Fairlight
- FR-049: Of Spirits Taken by Farbrausch & Vacuum

==== Best Soundtrack ====
- 1995 by keWlers & MFX
- Animal Attraction by Andromeda Software Development
- Track One by Fairlight
- Deities by MFX
- Starstruck by The Black Lotus

==== Best Direction ====
- Starstruck by The Black Lotus
- Chaos Theory by Conspiracy
- Track One by Fairlight
- Deities by MFX
- Die Ewigkeit Schmerzt by Neuro

==== Most Original Concept ====
- Old Skool Invitro Maker - Sundown 06 Invite by Ate Bit
- The Evolution of Vision by Andromeda Software Development
- Captive by Andromeda Software Development
- Trans*Form by Focus
- Die Ewigkeit Schmerzt by Neuro

==== Breakthrough Performance ====
- Iterate by Imbusy & Xerxes
- Balance by Adapt
- Solaris - Kiss Our ASSembler by Brainstorm
- Led Blur by Mindlapse
- Remembrance - The Dolphin's Dream by Vovoid

==== Public's Choice ====
- 1995 by keWlers & MFX
- Animal Attraction by Andromeda Software Development
- Chaos Theory by Conspiracy
- Derealization by Dead Hackers Society
- Starstruck by The Black Lotus

=== 2005 ===
==== Best Demo ====
- Aether by mfx
- Final Audition by Plastic
- Iconoclast by Andromeda Software Development
- Ocean Machine by The Black Lotus
- STS-04: Instant Zen by Synesthetics

==== Best 64k Intro ====
- Che Guevara by Fairlight
- Binary Flow - the Assembly'05 invitation by Conspiracy
- Death and Taxes by Fairlight
- Fiat Homo by Traction
- Memories from the MCP by Brain Control

==== Best 4k Intro ====
- Parsec by Frenetic & r0K
- Anorgatronikum by Calodox
- Noxie by Loonies
- Panoptriptikum by Calodox
- Synchroplastikum by Calodox

==== Best Effects ====
- Aether by mfx
- I'am the seed by CyberPunks Unity and Inward
- Iconoclast by Andromeda Software Development
- Newton never did this, BITCH by Shitfaced Clowns
- STS-04: Instant Zen by Synesthetics

==== Best Graphics ====
- Ocean Machine by The Black Lotus
- Don't stop by Portal Process
- Final Audition by Plastic
- Perfect Love by LKCC and Bauknecht

==== Best Soundtrack ====
- Ocean Machine by The Black Lotus
- Aether by mfx
- Fair Play to the Queen by Candela
- Iconoclast by Andromeda Software Development
- STS-04: Instant Zen by Synesthetics

==== Best Direction ====
- Poison Ivy by Exceed
- Che Guevara by Fairlight
- Fairplay to the Queen by Candela
- Iconoclast by Andromeda Software Development
- Perfect Love by LKCC and Bauknecht

==== Most Original Concept ====
- The Ballet Dancer by mfx
- Antifact by Limp Ninja
- Barn by The Digital Artists
- Bugtro by Mostly Harmless
- Hello:Friend by Fairlight

==== Breakthrough Performance ====
- Fairplay to the Queen by Candela
- Memories from the MCP by Brain Control
- SHizZLE by Team Pokeme
- Tannhauser Gate by Cubicle
- Trocken by Bauknecht

==== Best Demo on an Oldskool Platform ====
- Boogie Factor by Fairlight
- Hello:Friend by Fairlight
- I'am the seed by CyberPunks Unity and Inward
- One Million Lightyears From Earth by Fairlight
- The Throckmorton Device by Triad

==== Public's Choice ====
- Iconoclast by Andromeda Software Development
- Aether by mfx
- Final Audition by Plastic
- Ocean Machine by The Black Lotus
- STS-04: Instant Zen by Synesthetics

=== 2004 ===
==== Best demo ====
- Planet Risk by Andromeda Software Development
- Coma (on the dance floor) by Cocoon
- We Cell by keWlers
- X-MIX 2004 by mfx and keWlers
- Arise by Stravaganza
- Silkcut by The Black Lotus

==== Best 64k intro ====
- The Prophecy - Project Nemesis by Conspiracy
- Beyond by Conspiracy
- Kings of the Playground - Evoke 2004 Invitation by Equinox
- Fresh! by Fairlight
- Paradise by rgba

==== Best 4k intro ====
- Micropolis by TBC and Mainloop
- Feet4 by AND
- San Angeles Observation by Armada
- Finnmark by Ephidrena
- Ex Fabric by Frenetic and KB

==== Best effects ====
- 47'111.0 by Faktory
- Planet Risk by Andromeda Software Development
- We Cell by keWlers
- Assembly 2004 Invitation by Moppi Productions
- Arise by Stravaganza

==== Best graphics ====
- Your Fingers So Gently On My Skin by Plastic
- Interceptor by Black Maiden
- Coma (on the dance floor) by Cocoon
- Arise by Stravaganza
- Silkcut by The Black Lotus

==== Best soundtrack ====
- Coma (on the dance floor) by Cocoon
- Planet Risk by Andromeda Software Development
- We Cell by keWlers
- X-MIX 2004 by mfx and keWlers
- Assembly 2004 Invitation by Moppi Productions

==== Best direction ====
- Amondo by Aenima
- Interceptor by Black Maiden
- Kings of the Playground - Evoke 2004 Invitation by Equinox
- Assembly 2004 Invitation by Moppi Productions
- Arise by Stravaganza
- Silkcut by The Black Lotus

==== Most original concept ====
- Assembly 2004 Invitation by Moppi Productions
- Panjabmoore Meets 007 Again by Calodox
- 8088 Corruption by Hornet
- X-MIX 2004 by mfx and keWlers
- Traction by Traction

==== Breakthrough performance ====
- Syntonic Dentiforms by Nesnausk
- Michera by Limp Ninja
- Synthematik by Outracks
- Glowsick by Portal Process
- I am by Traction

==== Public's Choice ====
- Planet Risk by Andromeda Software Development
- The Prophecy - Project Nemesis by Conspiracy
- Kings of the Playground - Evoke 2004 Invitation by Equinox
- We Cell by keWlers
- Silkcut by The Black Lotus

=== 2003 ===
==== Best Demo ====
- IX by Moppi Productions
- Doomsday by Complex
- fr-025: The Popular Demo by Farbrausch
- Protozoa by keWlers
- A Significant Deformation Near the Cranium by keWlers

==== Best 64k Intro ====
- fr-030: Candytron by Farbrausch
- Zoom3 by AND and Cybermag
- Project Genesis by Conspiracy
- fr-034 / HJB-104: Time Index by Farbrausch and Haujobb
- Point Blank by Stockholm Syndrome

==== Best 4k Intro ====
- Yellow Rose of Texas by Fit and Bandwagon
- Acid Ice by AND
- Sponge by Freestyle
- Mojo Dreams by Frenetic and r0K
- Robotic Warrior by PWP

==== Best Effects ====
- Aura for Laura by Soopadoopa
- Zoom3 by AND and Cybermag
- Doomsday by Complex
- fr-025: The Popular Demo by Farbrausch
- A Significant Deformation Near the Cranium by keWlers

==== Best Graphics ====
- Relais by Kolor
- fr-031: Faded Memories by Farbrausch
- A Significant Deformation Near the Cranium by keWlers
- Grafikal Jihad by Mankind
- IX by Moppi Productions

==== Best Soundtrack ====
- A Significant Deformation Near the Cranium by keWlers
- Dreamchild by Andromeda Software Development
- fr-025: The Popular Demo by Farbrausch
- Protozoa by keWlers
- Pornonoise by Lunix and mfx

==== Best Direction ====
- IX by Moppi Productions
- A Place Called Universe by Conspiracy
- 45 For Electricity Edit by Lunix
- I Feel Like A Computer by Melon Dezign
- Staying Pictures by TPOLM

==== Most original concept ====
- IX by Moppi Productions
- Heart Shaped Box by Haujobb
- Protozoa by keWlers
- I Feel Like A Computer by Melon Dezign
- Staying Pictures by TPOLM

==== Breakthrough Performance ====
- Project Genesis by Conspiracy
- Political Statement With a Well Hidden Message by Matt Current
- Die Anderung by Spontz
- Point Blank by Stockholm Syndrome
- Phloam by Unique

==== Public's Choice ====
- fr-025: The Popular Demo by Farbrausch
- Zoom3 by AND and Cybermag
- Dreamchild by Andromeda Software Development
- Protozoa by keWlers
- IX by Moppi Productions

=== 2002 ===
==== Best Demo ====
- Variform by keWlers
- Raw Confessions by Cocoon
- Planet Loop by Madwizards and Nah-Kolor
- Halla by Moppi Productions
- Little Nell by The Black Lotus

==== Best Intro ====
- Planet Potion by Potion
- Squish by AND
- fr-019: Poem to a Horse by Farbrausch
- Gracchus by Kolor and Freestyle
- Salmiakki by TPOLM

==== Best Effects ====
- Variform by keWlers
- fr-019: Poem to a Horse by Farbrausch
- A Deepness In The Sky by mfx
- Planet Potion by Potion
- 32 Degrees In The Shade by Yodel

==== Best Graphics ====
- Raw Confessions by Cocoon
- Liquid... Wen? by Haujobb
- Planet Loop by Madwizards and Nah-Kolor
- Halla by Moppi Productions
- Little Nell by The Black Lotus

==== Best Soundtrack ====
- Variform by keWlers
- Retrograde by Black Maiden
- Liquid... Wen? by Haujobb
- Planet Potion by Potion
- Little Nell by The Black Lotus

==== Best Direction ====
- Tom Thumb by TPOLM
- Visual Approach To The Aesthetics Of Techno by Neuro.Concept
- Variform by keWlers
- Halla by Moppi Productions
- Amour by Orion

==== Most original concept ====
- Easter Egg by Orion
- +1-1 by !=
- Superjam Superheroes by Mandarine
- fr-029: Dopplerdefekt by Farbrausch
- Chimera by Halcyon

==== Breakthrough Performance ====
- Squish by AND
- Petroleo by Boah
- Paradise Is Coming by rgba
- This Way by Stravaganza
- The S by Suspend

== Bibliography ==
- Grenfell, Paul (1 May 2010). "Scene.org Awards". Game Developer. 17 (5): 5. ISSN 1073-922X.
