= Tristar and Red Sector Incorporated =

Demogroup

TRSI pixel-drawn logo by J.O.E

Tristar and Red Sector Incorporated (TRSI) is a demogroup which formed in 1990. It came about from the longest-running cooperation in scene history. RSI existed from 1985, before being joined by the "T" later on. Evolving from the Commodore 64 to the Amiga and later to PC and various game console platforms - like the PlayStation, Xbox, Nintendo - and set-ups like Arduino, Android or Blu-ray, TRSI released a number of digital productions, dedicated to experimenting in phreaking or network alteration. Its members were spread around the world and still contribute to computer scene art and code after more than 27 years of history.

== History ==
=== 1985 to 1987 ===
Red Sector Incorporated (RSI) was founded with a focus on the Commodore 64 as a group for cracks, fixes, trainers, packs, intros and demos. The founders were three suppliers from Canada: Bill Best, Greg and Kangol Kid. After the initial formation in the spring of 1985, The Skeleton and Baudsurfer set up RSI's first domain, "The Pirates Ship" BBS the following summer, which eventually became the "Dawn of Eternity" BBS.

At the end of the year, Irata and Mister Zeropage were asked to join the group and set up a European section in Germany, with Irata being the group's main trader, followed by additional importers in the United States. Slogans at the time included "No risk, no fun - Red Sector Number One" and "Red Sector - The Leading Force". The Light Circle was a basis for several future European members of RSI, a coalition of Radwar Enterprises, Cracking Force Berlin and Flash Cracking Formation.

Red Sector Incorporated first released on the Amiga 1000 in 1986. During the summer, RSI decided to concentrate on the Amiga and formed an Amiga division.

In the beginning of 1987, Red Sector's Commodore 64 section became dormant, to bundle forces on the Amiga. At this time, RSI's first Amiga demo was coded by HQC and released to the Scene. It was followed by the second, "Twilight with Music" by Karsten Obarski. At the end of the year, a short-term cooperation was formed with Ghenna of Defjam, marking the first group cooperation on the Amiga.

== Bibliography ==
- Tamas Polgar. 2005. Freax - The brief history of the computer Demoscene. CSW Verlag. Pages 107, 140, 155.
- Tamas Polgar. 2006. Freax - The Art album. CSW Verlag. Pages 125, 153, 154, 157.
- Denis Moschitto and Evrim Sen. 2007. Hackerland - Logfile of the Scene. Social Media Verlag. Glossar.
