= Revision (demoparty) =

Annual demoparty in Saarbrücken, Germany

Revision is an annual demoparty during Easter in Saarbrücken, Germany. It is the successor of the Breakpoint party series, and retains many of the organizing staff. The event was established in 2011, after Breakpoint had announced its end in 2010.

The party hosts around 800 people from around the world each year. It is currently the largest pure-demoscene event in the world. Since 2022, it has encouraged "satellite events" to further participate in the event remotely from around the world.

== Editions ==
Revision, like its predecessors, always takes place on Easter weekend; the dates of the event thus follow Computus.

- Revision 2011: April 22–25
- Revision 2012: April 6–9
- Revision 2013: March 29 – April 1
- Revision 2014: April 18–21
- Revision 2015: April 3–6
- Revision 2016: March 25–28
- Revision 2017: April 14–17
- Revision 2018: March 30 – April 2
- Revision 2019: April 19–22
- Revision 2020: April 10–13 — Conference held entirely online due to the COVID-19 pandemic
- Revision 2021: April 2–5 — Conference held entirely online due to the COVID-19 pandemic
- Revision 2022: April 15–18
- Revision 2023: April 7–10
- Revision 2024: March 29 – April 1
- Revision 2025: April 18–21
- Revision 2026: April 3–6
