= Chaos Constructions =

Demoscene festival in Russia

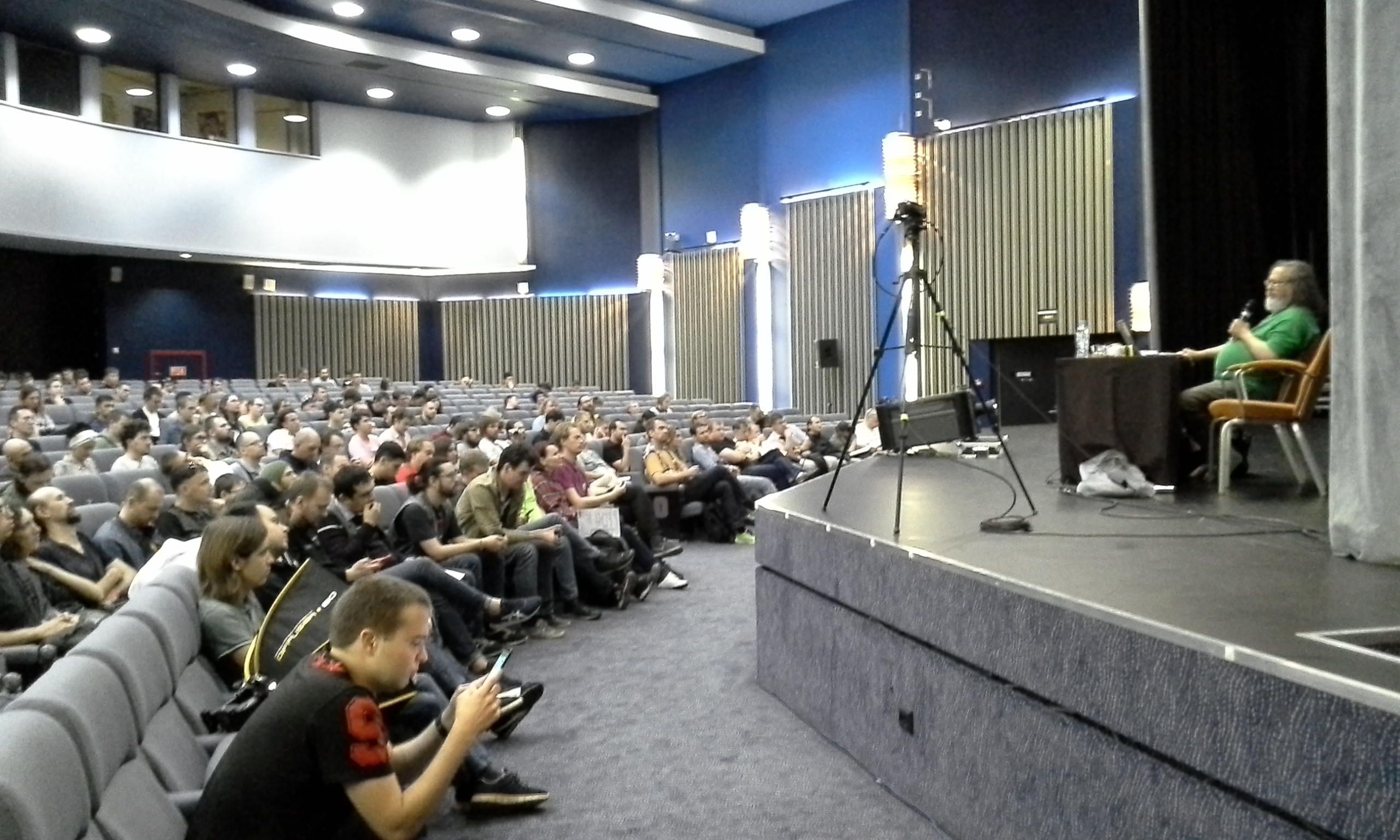
- Richard Stallman opens Chaos Constructions 2019
- Genre: demoscene
- Locations: Saint Petersburg, Russia
- Major events: ChaosConf
- Website: chaosconstructions.ru/en/

Chaos Constructions is the oldest demoparty in Russia, previously known as ENLiGHT. Nowadays, it is considered to be an annual computer art festival and IT conference.

== History ==
The demoscene (Russian: русскоязычная демосцена) began to form in CIS countries in the early 1990s, when people massively began to possess home computers such as ZX Spectrum, Amiga and Atari and make tracker music, demos and other artwork on them. They were exchanging it using compact cassettes, floppy disks, FIDOnet and later the Internet, so that these artists joined the worldwide demoscene culture. By the year 1995, the first Russian demoparty occurred, located in St. Petersburg—the second-largest Russian city, situated close to Finland, the country with one of the strongest demoscene cultures.

The demoparty was entitled ENLiGHT; it gathered around 150 people. It was followed by ENLiGHT'96 and ENLiGHT'97; the latter gathered more than 1200 people.

The year 1998 was skipped, and the 1999 festival was held in a new format and under the new name Chaos Constructions.

In 2006 the event's format was shifted closer to a LAN party.

2009 event featured software crash test competition supported by IT companies.

The 2017 festival featured an extra event called ChaosConf which was aimed at developers and admins of enterprise IT systems.

== Present day ==
Traditionally it is held on a weekend at the end of August at Saint Petersburg, Russia. Creative competitions for computer artists and musicians, as well as programmers, are the important part of the event. The competitions ("compos") are both for pre-released and real-time works. Many of the compos and exhibits are related to retro computing (ASCII art, pixel art, tracker music, chiptune etc.), but recent festivals also tend to include conferences and meetings for people from the modern IT industry who concentrate on technologies such as augmented/virtual reality, blockchain, robotics and more.

The 2018 festival was held at a co-working location called Boiling Point and also featured "enterprise" and "telecom" sections. There were several thematic areas; the party went for 2 days without breaking at night. Twitch broadcast it online, and international English-speaking people also participated. The festival's crew also had arranged an "embassy" at a similar earlier gathering called Geek Picnic.

The 2019 festival was held on 24–25 August at Pulkovskaya hotel. The 2019 event was opened by Richard Stallman. A major government-related leak of many people's personal data was disclosed at the 2019 event.

In February 2020 a smaller "winter version" was organized, some of the contests were preparatory for the forthcoming "main summer version". in 2021 a Winter and Summer Edition was held and in 2022 the event is planned to be held too

=== Gallery ===
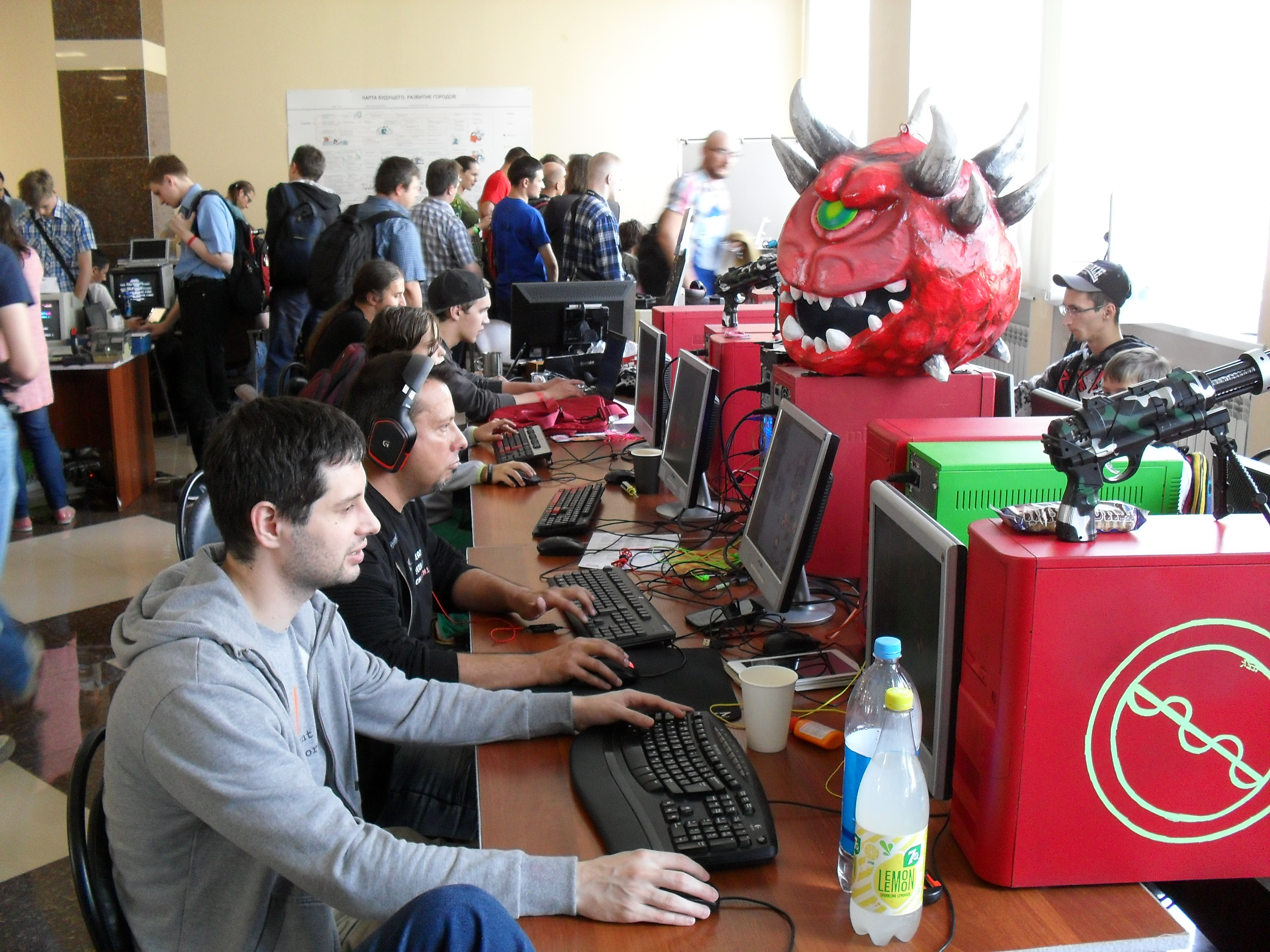
Chaos Constructions 2018: retro-cybersport contests

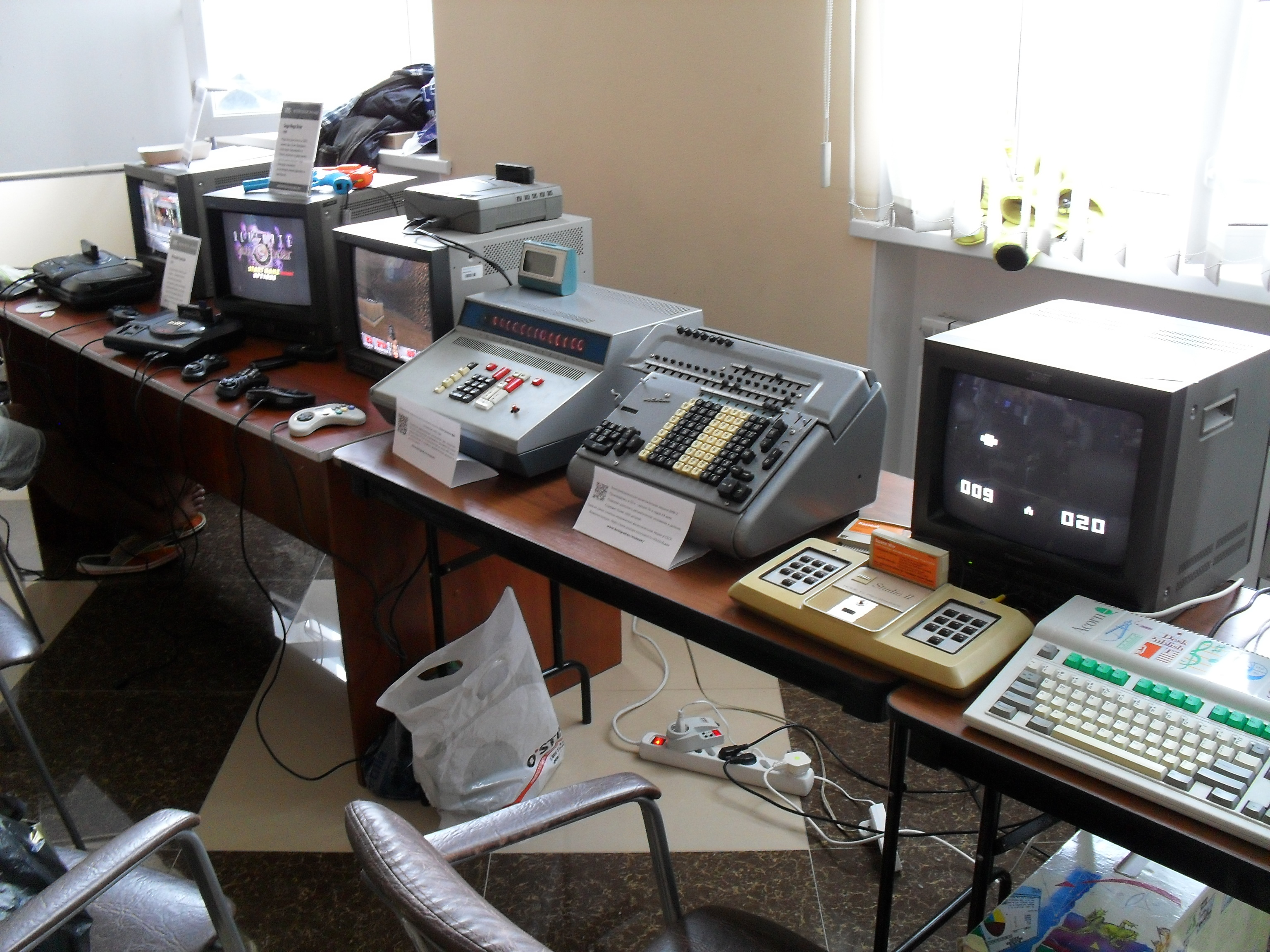
Chaos Constructions 2018: retrocomputing exhibit

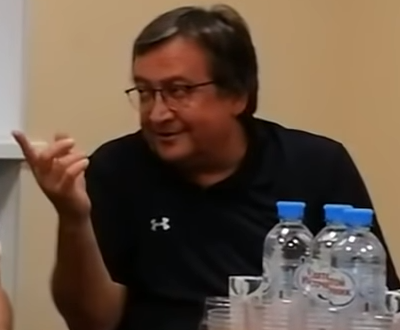
ICANN officer Dmitry Burkov talks at Chaos Constructions 2018

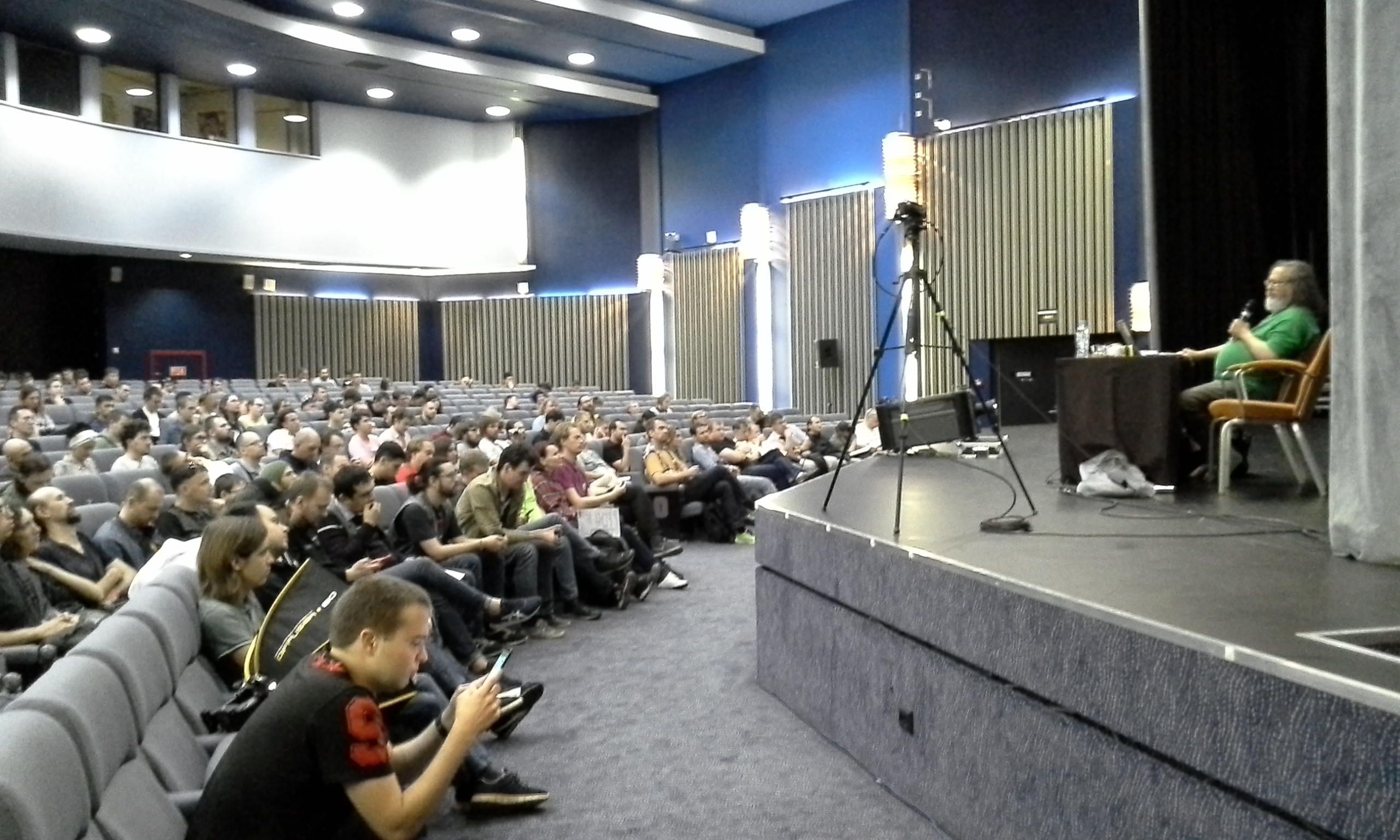
Richard Stallman opens Chaos Constructions 2019

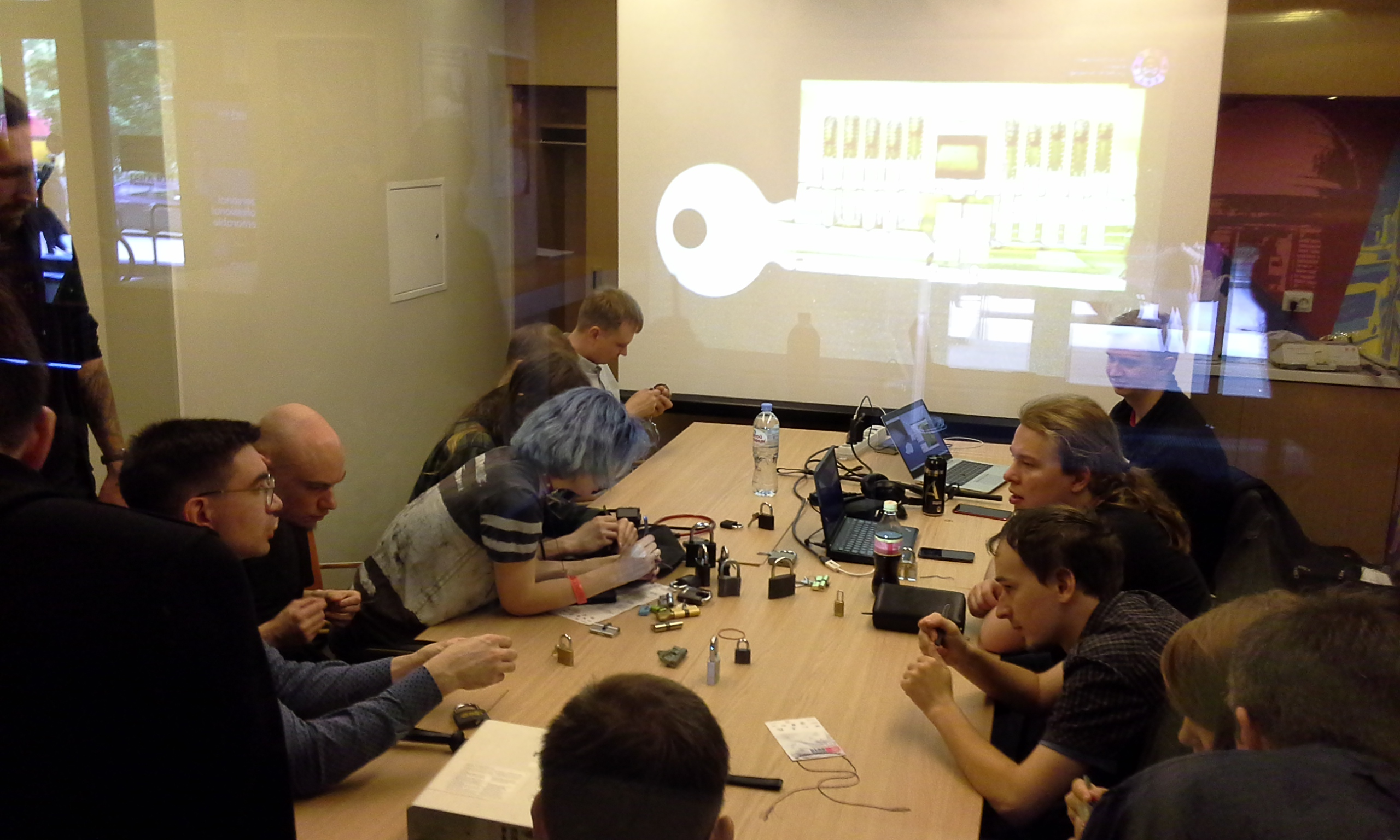
Chaos Constructions 2019: lock-breaking contest

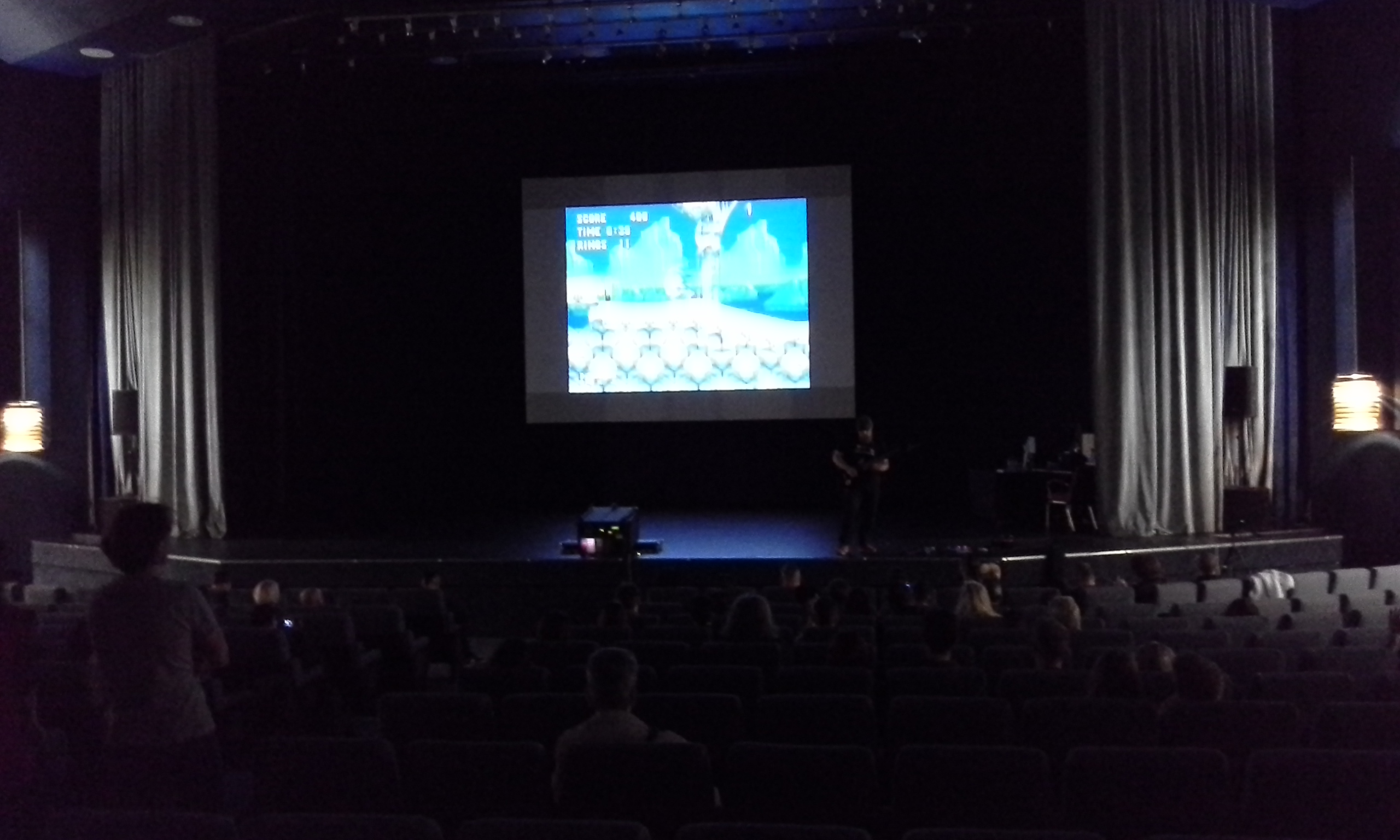
2019 main scene: demos, ANSI art, ASCII art, tracker music and more

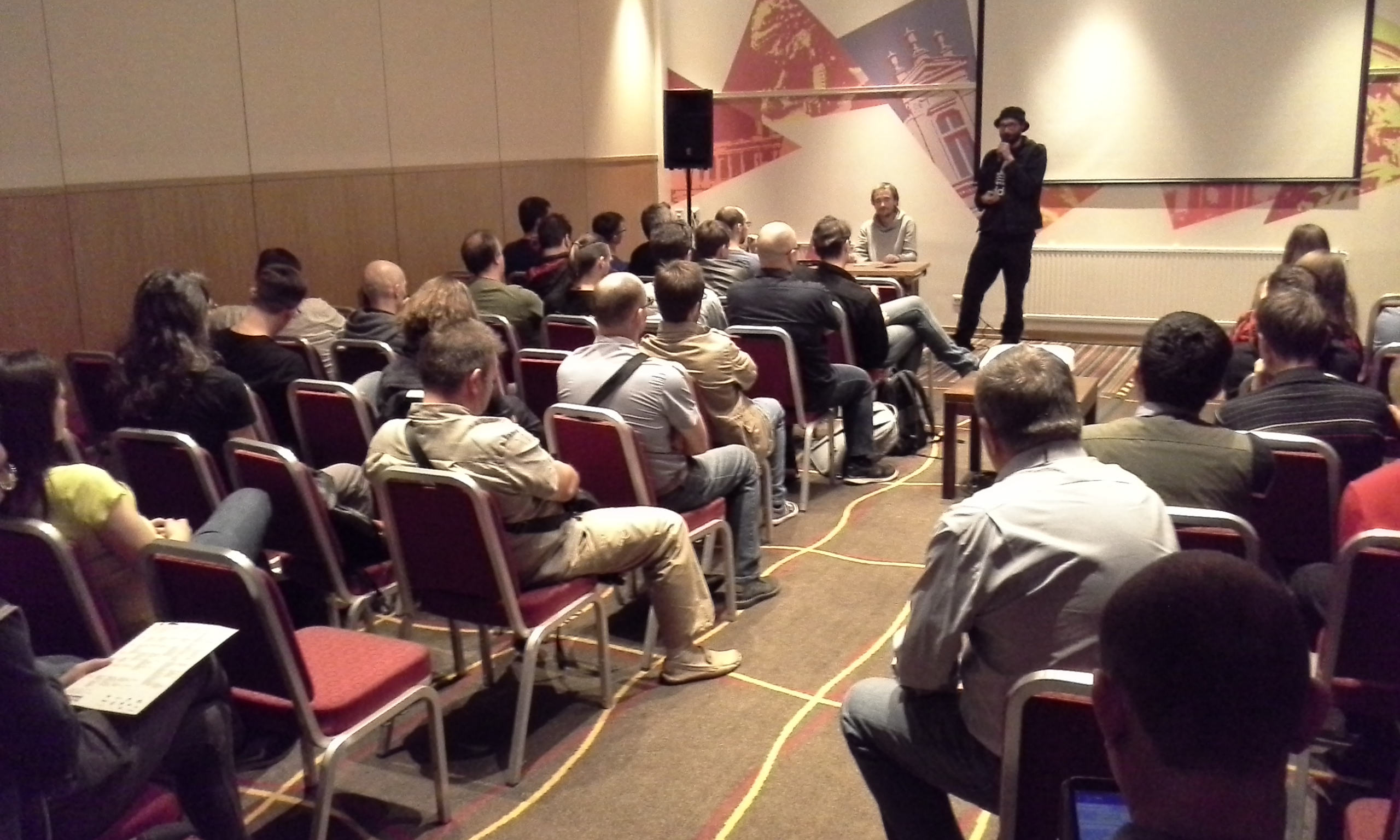
2019 panel discussion "History of Russian Hackers at the Post-Soviet states"

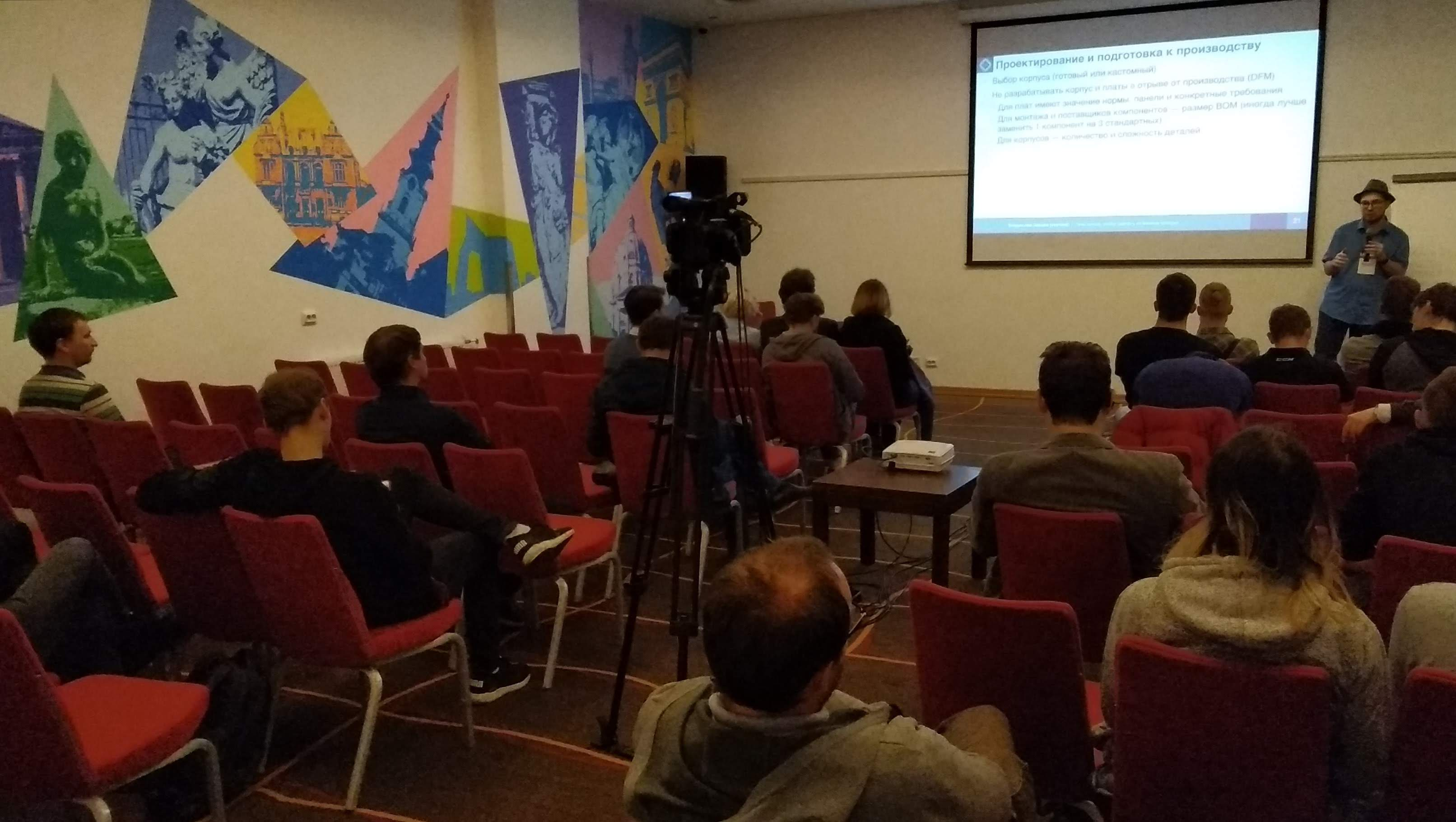
HackConf 2022

== See also ==
- Sysadmin Day
