= Box modeling =

3D modeling technique

Box modeling is a technique in 3D modeling where a primitive shape (such as a box, cylinder, sphere, etc.) is used to make the basic shape of the final model. This basic shape is then used to sculpt out the final model. The process uses a number of repetitive steps to reach the final product, which can lead to a more efficient and more controlled modelling process.

== Subdivision ==
Subdivision modeling is derived from the idea that as a work is progressed, should the artist want to make their work appear less sharp, or "blocky", each face would be divided up into smaller, more detailed faces (usually into sets of four). However, more experienced box modelers manage to create their model without subdividing the faces of the model. Basically, box modeling is broken down into the very basic concept of polygonal management.

== Quads ==
Quadrilateral faces, commonly named "quads", are the fundamental entity in box modeling. If an artist were to start with a cube, the artist would have six quad faces to work with before extrusion. While most applications for three-dimensional art provide abilities for faces up to any size, results are often more predictable and consistent when working with quads. This is so because if one were to draw an X connecting the corner vertices of a quad, the surface normal is nearly always the same. We say nearly because, when a quad is something other than a perfect parallelogram (such as a rhombus or trapezoid), the surface normal would be different. Also, a quad subdivides into two or four triangles cleanly, making it easier to prepare the model for software that can only handle triangles.

== Advantages and disadvantages ==
Box modeling is a modeling method that is quick and easy to learn. It is also appreciably faster than placing each point individually. However, it is difficult to add high amounts of detail to models created using this technique without practice.
