= Dmitry Burkov =

Russian internet engineer (born 1960)

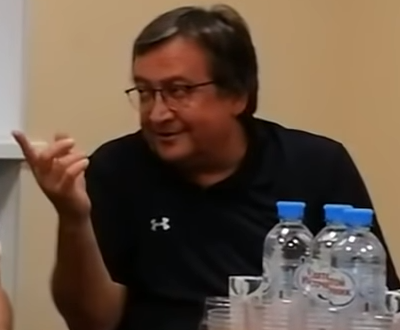
- Burkov at Chaos Constructions 2018
- Born: 12 April 1960 (age 66)
- Occupations: Chairman of the Board of the Foundation for Assistance for Internet Technologies and Infrastructure Development
- Awards: Award of Ministerial council of the USSR for the participation in the development of the Soviet network operating system DEMOS; Honorary certificate of the Ministry of Communications and Mass Media of the Russian Federation; Medal of the Order "For Merit to the Fatherland"

Dmitry Vladimirovich Burkov (Russian: Дмитрий Владимирович Бурков; born 12 April 1960) is one of the Internet industry pioneers in Russia, Chairman of the Board of the Foundation for Assistance for Internet Technologies and Infrastructure Development, one of the originators of the Eurasia Network Operators' Group (ENOG).

== Biography ==
Burkov graduated from the Saint Petersburg State Electrotechnical University in 1983. While a student, he worked in the Microsystems Laboratory of the Russian Academy of Sciences on modeling and development of various systems and networks. Between 1983 and 1994, he worked for the St. Petersburg Institute for Informatics and Automation of the Russian Academy of Sciences (SPIIRAS).

In the late 1980s Burkov co-founded Demos, one of Russia’s first Internet service providers. Later he was a Board Member at Relcom, another oldest Russian ISP. He also worked in the management of the major Russian telecommunications companies: Comstar, Rostelecom and RTComm.

== Projects ==
In 1990, Burkov directly contributed to establishing an Internet connection between Moscow (the Kurchatov Institute) and Finland (the University of Helsinki). In 1995, he participated in creating Russia’s first traffic exchange facility: MSK-IX (Moscow Internet Exchange).

Burkov made a significant contribution to the integration and development process related to the Russian .RU and .РФ TLDs. In particular, he was the first Chairperson of the Council of Coordination Center for the TLD .RU (administrator of the Russian national top level domains .RU and .РФ) and remained a Council Member until 2009.

He took part in the operations of the Russian Association for Networks and Services.

Burkov ensured Russia’s presence in the following organizations: EUnet, CIX, RIPE NCC (the Regional Internet Registry for Europe, the Middle East and parts of Central).

From 2006 till 2018, Brurkov was a Board Member and the ICANN Liaison at the RIPE NCC. In 2010, Burkov was among those who initiated the establishment of the Eurasia Network Operators’ Group (ENOG) and also took part in Key Generation Ceremony and signing of the DNS root zone using the DNSSEC technology. He became a Trusted Community Representative (TCR), a Crypto Officer for the US West Coast Facility.

Burkov is a member of the ICANN Customer Standing Committee (ICANN CSC).

== Awards ==
Dmitry Burkov received an Award of Council of Ministers of the USSR for the participation in the development of the Soviet network operating system DEMOS, as well as an Honorary certificate of the Ministry of Communications and Mass Media of the Russian Federation. In 2020 president Putin awarded Burkov also a Medal of the Order "For Merit to the Fatherland" "for achievements in setup of Russian segment of informational and telecommunicational network Internet".
