= Breakpoint (demoparty) =

Former annual demoscene party

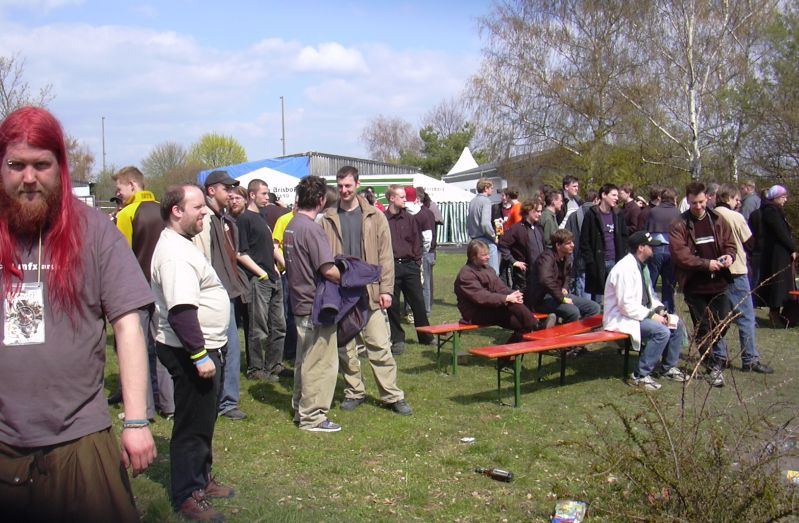
Breakpoint 2004—'the real party is outside'

Breakpoint was an annual demoscene party held in Bingen, Germany during Easter from 2003 to 2010. The successor to Mekka & Symposium, an annual German demoscene party that had ended in 2002, Breakpoint grew to become the largest annual event focused solely on the demoscene. It attained over 1000 visitors at its height, attracting demosceners from Germany, Sweden, Finland, Poland, Spain, Australia, and Canada, among others. It was also the host of the Scene.org Awards ceremony from 2003 to 2010.

It was succeeded by Revision in 2011.

== History ==
=== Background ===
Mekka & Symposium had been an annual demoscene party held in Fallingbostel, Germany from 1996 to 2002. Hosting of the event ended in 2002 following internal tensions among its organizing team. Later that year, several former members of the Mekka & Symposium organizing team announced the creation of Breakpoint as a successor demoscene party in collaboration with other German demoscene party organizers, including ones from Dialogos, Evoke, and the Ultimate Meeting. It would held annually during Easter at an abandoned military depot in Bingen, a small town near Frankfurt.

=== Early years (2003–2006) ===
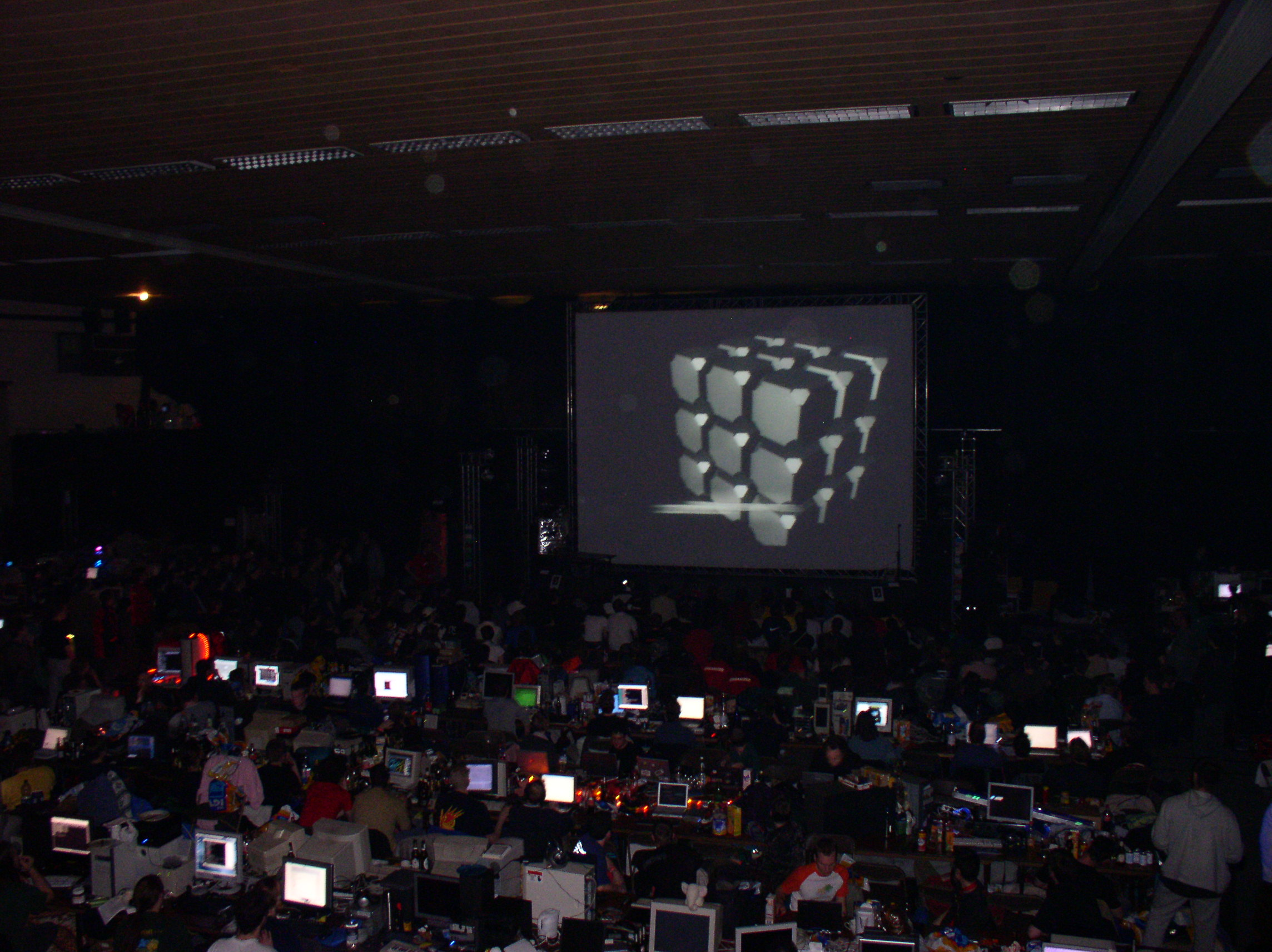
View from the grand stand at Breakpoint 2005 while a demo was running.

The inaugural Breakpoint 2003 event was a success among the demosceners who attended, with both veterans and newcomers praising its atmosphere and freedom. Although criticisms of the party were minor, the failure of one of the building's heating pipes led to the event being dubbed "Freezepoint" by a parody demo. The event was also hosted the inaugural Scene.org Awards ceremony.

ATI Technologies became the main sponsor of Breakpoint starting in 2004, providing the event with funding for prizes, seminars, workshops, and a helicopter flight over the hills of the Rhineland. While the event was a success, the inability to resolve the building's heating issues from the year prior deterred a number of visitors. Due to the deteriorating state of the military depot building, it was scheduled for demolition by the German government later that year.

Due to the demolition of its original venue, Breakpoint 2005 was moved to the Bingen city gym, a choice some demoscene members feared would diminish the atmosphere of the event, including the loss of its symbolic bonfire. The event proved to be a success nonetheless, with seminars, demo releases, and four live demoscene music concerts occurring in the heated, carpeted room of the new venue. It was later voted as the "Best Alltime Demoparty" in the PAiN diskmag.

Breakpoint 2006 was given a jungle setting—its venue adorned with torches, rocks, skeletons, and vines—to contextualize sceners competing to search for and regain their scene spirit. The event featured the annual Scene.org Awards ceremony in a much more formal and ceremonial setting, along with seminars and live music, including a performance by Welle:Erdball.

=== Later years (2007–2010) ===
As a result of AMD's acquisition of ATI Technologies in July 2006, Intel became the primary sponsor of Breakpoint 2007, rather than secondary as it had been in prior years. Left with a deficit in its budget to host the 2007 iteration of Breakpoint, the event's organizers raised the entrance fee to 60 euros and abandoned its tradition of allowing women to attend the event for free. Despite the financial challenges, Breakpoint 2007 featured the usual array of competitions and seminars, along with live music from BASS and the Danish Commodore revival band Press Play On Tape. The Scene.org Awards ceremony was restructured with shorter screening times to reduce its length.

Breakpoint 2008 added Nvidia as a major sponsor, allowing event organizers to lower the entrance fee to €55 and acquire two 1080p projectors to screen demos on a 70 m^{2} (750 sq ft) screen. Nvidia did not return as a sponsor for the 2009 iteration of Breakpoint, leaving it without a major sponsor to cover the majority of costs. Although donations and the sale of €250 supporter tickets made up for some of the lost windfall and enabled regular tickets to remain at €55, Breakpoint 2009 lacked features such as seminars due to budgetary constraints. 20th Century Fox was added as a major sponsor for the event on short notice, resulting in the inclusion of a contest for demos, videos, art, and music featuring the character Wolverine as a means of promoting the film X-Men Origins: Wolverine. While Breakpoint was unable pay performers, Xerxes, Romeo Knight, and Bendik returned to perform in a free concert.

Breakpoint 2010 was the final Breakpoint event, holding a record attendance of over a thousand visitors. As the last day of the event coincided with NASA's launch of the STS-131 space shuttle, the launch was streamed at the event prior to the award ceremony.

=== Successor ===
Several months after the Breakpoint's conclusion, a successor demoparty entitled Revision was announced. Launching the following year in the same Easter time window as its predecessor, Revision would be hosted in Saarbrücken, Germany by an organizing team consisting mostly of former Breakpoint organizers.

== Events ==
1. Breakpoint 2003 — (April 18–21)
2. Breakpoint 2004 — "The Code Inside" (April 9–12)
3. Breakpoint 2005 — "Aliens Ate My Demomaker" (March 25–28)
4. Breakpoint 2006 — "Rumble in the Jungle" (April 14–17)
5. Breakpoint 2007 — "Demoscene Through Time and Space" (April 6–9)
6. Breakpoint 2008 — "Digital Garden" (March 21–24)
7. Breakpoint 2009 — "Everything Is Under Control" (April 10–13)
8. Breakpoint 2010 — "Like There's No Tomorrow" (April 2–5)

== Competition winners ==
Breakpoint demo/intro compo winners, 2003–2010
Year	Platform	Demo	64k intro	4k intro
2003	Amiga	Magia (The Black Lotus)	Cancelled	Timur Lenk (Ephidrena & Spaceballs)
2003	C64	Beertime 3 (Dekadence)	N/A	Voyage Sans Fin (K2)
2003	PC	FR-025: The.Popular.Demo (Farbrausch)	Project Genesis (Conspiracy)	Mojo Dreams (Frenetic & R0k)
2004	Amiga	Silkcut (The Black Lotus)	A Dream (Scoopex)	Ikanim (Loonies)
2004	C64	You Know The Routine 2 (Camelot)	N/A	Bar4kode (Plush)
2004	PC	Winnerdemo (Metalvotze)	Saturday Night Scener (Conspiracy)	Ex-Fabric (Frenetic & KB)
2005	Amiga	Ocean Machine (The Black Lotus)	A Dream 2 (Scoopex)	Noxie (Loonies)
2005	C64	RCC 2005 Invitro (RCC Team)	N/A	Pico (Dekadence)
2005	PC	195/95 (Plastic)	Binary Flow (Conspiracy)	Parsec (Frenetic, r0k & Sonic)
2006	Amiga	Kilofix (Iris)	Planet Loonies (Loonies) (combined 64k/4k compo)	
2006	C64	Non Plus Ultra (Singular Crew)	N/A	Artefacts (Plush)
2006	PC	Deities (mfx)	Meet the Family (Fairlight)	Origami (Kakiarts)
2007	Amiga	Senzala (Madwizards)	Leon (Elcrew)	Swex ([S]carab)
2007	C64	Desert Dream (Chorus & Resource)	N/A	Cancelled
2007	PC	FR-041: Debris (Farbrausch)	Phantom Eye Syndrome (Brain Control)	Sprite-O-Mat (Alcatraz)
2008	Amiga	Twenty (Drifters)	Psylteflesk (Loaderror / Ephidrena) - 4k (combined 64k/4k compo)	
2008	C64	Cauldron (Resource & The Dreams)	N/A	Cancelled
2008	PC	Masagin (Farbrausch & Neuro)	Pimp My Spectrum (Ate Bit)	Atrium (TBC & Loonies)
2009	Amiga	Jesus Christ Motocross (Nature & Traktor)	Superkewl (Supergroup)	Luminagia (Loonies)
2009	C64	Das Gottler (Extend)	N/A	Cancelled
2009	PC	Crush (Anadune & Floppy)	060659 (Rebels)	Elevated (RGBA)
2010	Amiga	We Come In Peace (Elude)	Charger (Focus Design)	Ikadalawampu (Loonies)
2010	C64	Snapshot (Glance)	N/A	Dramatic Pixels (PWP)
2010	PC	Agenda Circling Forth (CNCD & Fairlight)	Imagine (CodingCat, Hel, Turri & TGGC)	Darwinism (Archee)
