= Blitter object =

Graphical element used by Amiga computers

A blitter object (Bob) is a graphical element (GEL) used by the Amiga computer. Bobs are hardware sprite-like objects, movable on the screen with the help of the blitter coprocessor.

== Overview ==
The AmigaOS GEL system consists of VSprites, Bobs, AnimComps (animation components) and AnimObs (animation objects), each extending the preceding with additional functionality. While VSprites are a virtualization of hardware sprites Bobs are drawn into a playfield by the blitter, saving and restoring the background of the GEL as required. The Bob with the highest video priority is the last one to be drawn, which makes it appear to be in front of all other Bobs.

In contrast to hardware sprites Bobs are not limited in size and number. Bobs require more processing power than sprites, because they require at least one DMA memory copy operation to draw them on the screen. Sometimes three distinct memory copy operations are needed: one to save the screen area where the Bob would be drawn, one to actually draw the Bob, and one later to restore the screen background when the Bob moves away.

An AnimComp adds animation to a Bob and an AnimOb groups AnimComps together and assigns them velocity and acceleration.

== See also ==
- Original Amiga chipset
