= Demoscene =

Computer art subculture

Second Reality, a 1993 demo by the Finnish group Future Crew

The demoscene (/ˈdɛmoʊˌsiːn/) is an international computer art subculture focused on producing demos: self-contained, sometimes extremely small, computer programs that produce audiovisual presentations. The purpose of a demo is to show off programming, visual art, and musical skills. Demos and other demoscene productions (graphics, music, videos, games) are shared, voted on and released online at festivals known as demoparties.

The scene started with the home computer revolution of the early 1980s, and the subsequent advent of software cracking. Crackers altered the code of computer games to remove copy protection, claiming credit by adding introduction screens of their own ("cracktros"). They soon started competing for the best visual presentation of these additions. Through the making of intros and stand-alone demos, a new community eventually evolved, independent of the gaming and software sharing scenes.

Demos are informally classified into several categories, mainly of size-restricted intros. The most typical competition categories for intros are the 64k intro and the 4K intro, where the size of the executable file is restricted to 65,536 and 4,096 bytes, respectively. In other competitions the choice of platform is restricted; only 8-bit computers like the Atari 800 or Commodore 64, or the 16-bit Amiga or Atari ST. Such restrictions provide a challenge for coders, musicians, and graphics artists, to make a device do more than was intended in its original design.

== History ==
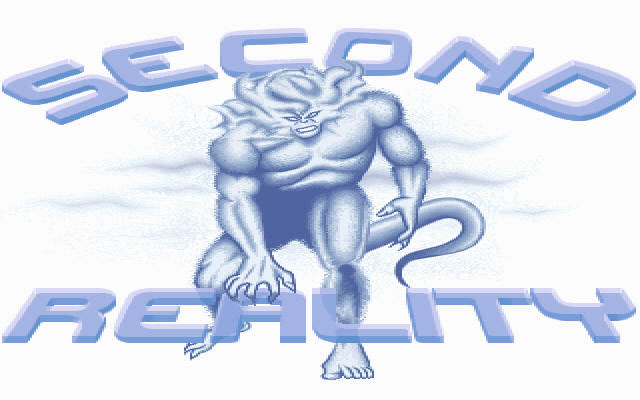
Title card of the Future Crew's Second Reality

The earliest computer programs that have some resemblance to demos and demo effects can be found among the so-called display hacks. Display hacks predate the demoscene by several decades, with the earliest examples dating back to the early 1950s.

Demos in the demoscene sense began as software crackers' "signatures", that is, crack screens and crack intros attached to software whose copy protection was removed. The first crack screens appeared on the Apple II in the early 1980s, and they were often nothing but plain text screens crediting the cracker or their group. Gradually, these static screens evolved into increasingly impressive-looking introductions containing animated effects and music. Eventually, many cracker groups started to release intro-like programs separately, without being attached to unlicensed software. These programs were initially known by various names, such as letters or messages, but they later came to be known as demos.

In 1980, Atari, Inc. began using a looping demo with visual effects and music to show the features of the Atari 400/800 computers in stores. At the 1985 Consumer Electronics Show, Atari showed a demoscene-style demo for its latest 8-bit computers that alternated between a 3D walking robot and a flying spaceship, each with its own music, and animating larger objects than typically seen on those systems; the two sections were separated by the Atari logo. The program was released to the public. Also in 1985, a large, spinning, checkered ball—casting a translucent shadow—was the signature demo of what the hardware was capable of when Commodore's Amiga was announced.

Simple demo-like music collections were put together on the C64 in 1985 by Charles Deenen, inspired by crack intros, using music taken from games and adding some homemade color graphics. In the following year, the movement now known as the demoscene was born. The Dutch groups 1001 Crew and The Judges, both Commodore 64-based, are often mentioned among the earliest demo groups. While competing with each other in 1986, they both produced pure demos with original graphics and music involving more than just casual work, and used extensive hardware trickery. At the same time demos from others, such as Antony Crowther, had started circulating on Compunet in the United Kingdom.

== Culture ==
The demoscene is mainly a European phenomenon. It is a competition-oriented subculture, with groups and individual artists competing against each other in technical and artistic excellence. Those who achieve excellence are dubbed "elite", while those who do not follow the demoscene's implicit rules are called "lamers"; such rules emphasize creativity over "ripping" (or using without permission) the works of others, having good contacts within the scene, and showing effort rather than asking for help. Both this competitiveness and the sense of cooperation among demosceners have led to comparisons with the earlier hacker culture in academic computing. The demoscene is a closed subculture, which seeks and receives little mainstream public interest. As of 2010, the size of the scene was estimated at some 10,000.

In the early days, competition came in the form of setting records, like the number of "bobs" (blitter objects) on the screen per frame, or the number of DYCP (Different Y Character Position) scrollers on a C64. These days, there are organized competitions, or compos, held at demoparties, although there have been some online competitions. It has also been common for diskmags to have voting-based charts which provide ranking lists for the best coders, graphicians, musicians, demos and other things.

In 2020, Finland added its demoscene to its national UNESCO list of intangible cultural heritage. It is the first digital subculture to be put on an intangible cultural heritage list. In 2021, Germany and Poland also added their demoscenes to their respective national UNESCO lists of intangible cultural heritage, the Netherlands in 2023 with Sweden and France in 2025.

=== Groups ===
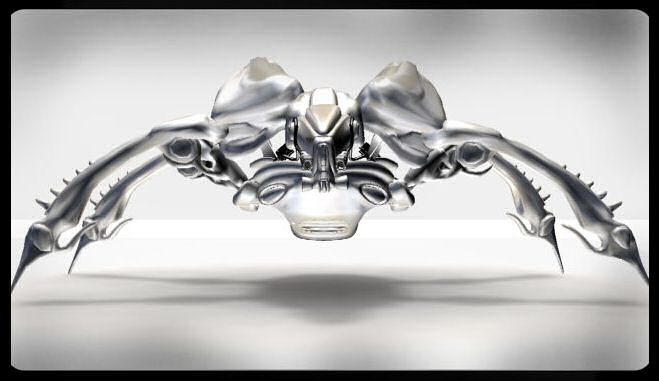
Interceptor by Black Maiden

Demosceners typically organize in small groups, centered around a coder (programmer), a musician, a graphician (graphics designer) and a swapper (who spreads their own and others' creations by mail).

Groups always have names, and similarly the individual members pick a handle by which they will be addressed in the large community. While the practice of using handles rather than real names is a borrowing from the cracker/warez culture, where it serves to hide the identity of the cracker from law enforcement, in the demoscene (oriented toward legal activities) it mostly serves as a manner of self-expression. Group members tend to self-identify with the group, often extending their handle with their group's name, following the patterns "Handle of Group" or "Handle/Group".

== Parties ==
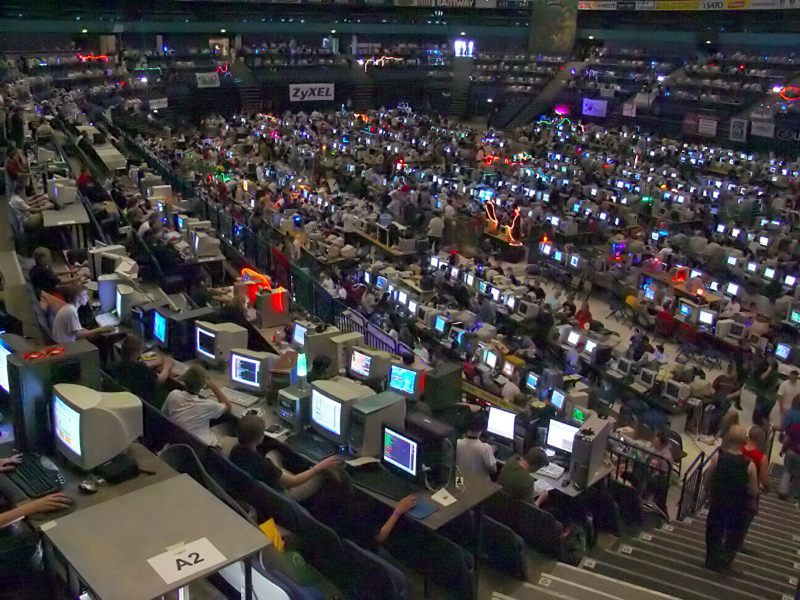
Assembly 2004 – a combination of a demoparty and a LAN party

A demoparty is an event where demosceners and other computer enthusiasts gather to take part in competitions, nicknamed compos, where they present demos (short audio-visual presentations of computer art) and other works such as digital art and music. A typical demoparty is a non-stop event spanning a weekend, giving visitors a lot of time to socialize. The competing works, at least those in the most important competitions, are usually shown at night, using a video projector and loudspeakers.

The most important competition is usually the demo compo. The Assembly is the biggest demoscene party. The Gathering became more of a players' party, the world's largest computerparty.

=== Concept ===
The visitors of a demoparty often bring their own computers to compete and show their works. To this end, most parties provide a large hall with tables, electricity and usually a local area network connected to the Internet. In this respect, many demoparties resemble LAN parties, and many of the largest events also gather gamers and other computer enthusiasts in addition to demosceners. A major difference between a real demoparty and a LAN party is that demosceners typically spend more time socializing (often outside the actual party hall) than in front of their computers.

=== List of demoparties ===
Party name	Location	Years	Description
7DX Party	Istanbul, Turkey	2002–2015	7DX was an annual demoparty that has been held since 2002 in Turkey. It is Turkey's first demo party that consists of demo-oriented competitions.
Abstract	Gliwice, Poland	2001–2009	A demo party organized annually with lots of demos, intros, chiptune music.
ACG Hack	Umeå, Sweden	1997–1999	A demo and LAN party organized by the Amiga Computer Group in Umeå.
Alternative Party	Helsinki, Finland	1998–2013, 2024	An alternative party visited mostly by demo scene veterans.
Arok Party	Ajka, Hungary	1999–	8-bit party, held each summer.
Art Engine	São Paulo, Brazil	2012	The second Brazilian demoparty ever organized.
Assembly	Helsinki, Finland	1992–	One of the longest-running demo parties in the world. Associated with Boozembly.
@party (Atparty)	Cambridge, Massachusetts, USA	2010–	Annual demo party in Massachusetts.
BIRDIE	Uppsala, Sweden	1993–	Oldest LAN Party of Sweden with a Demoscene
Bizarre	Etten-Leur, Netherlands	1994–2000	First PC demo party in The Netherlands. The first edition was held in Nijmegen, all others in Etten-Leur.
Blockparty / PixelJam	Cleveland, Ohio, USA	2007–2010, 2011–2012	Both parties held in conjunction with Notacon.
BCN Party	Barcelona, Spain	2000–2007	The only demoscene party in Barcelona.
Breakpoint	Bingen, Germany	2003–2010	Formerly the world's largest "scene-only" demoparty, successor of the Mekka & Symposium party series. Followed by Revision.
CAFePARTY	Kazan, Russia	1999–	Main oldschool party in Russia.
Chaos Constructions	Saint Petersburg, Russia	1999–	The largest demoparty in ex-Soviet countries, successor of the Enlight parties.
Cookie	Paris, France	2016–	The demoparty in Paris succeeding to DemoJS, but leaving out the focus on web technologies.
Compusphere	Gothenburg, Sweden	1993–	One of the oldest demoparties in Sweden.
Coven	Adelaide, Australia	1995–2001	Started at Adelaide Uni then later changed venues to Ngapartji Multimedia Centre. Organised by local groups POP and FTS.
Datastorm	Gothenburg, Sweden	2010–2019	Amiga/C64 copy party.
Deadline	Berlin, Germany	2014–	Annual demoparty/computer arts festival in Berlin, organized by Computerkunst e.V.
Demobit	Bratislava, Slovakia	1995–	The biggest multiplatform party in Slovakia. Resurrected after 20 years in 2017.
DemoJS	Paris, France	2011–2014	The only demoparty strictly focused on open web technologies. Followed by Cookie.
Demosplash	Pittsburgh, Pennsylvania, USA	2011–	Hosted by the Carnegie Mellon University Computer Club.
DiHalt	Nizhny Novgorod, Russia	1999–	Second largest demoparty in Russia (after Chaos Constructions).
DreamHack	Jönköping, Sweden	1994–	World's largest LAN-party, which later became more of Gaming party / E-Sports event.
Equinox	France	1988–2007	Atari ST and PC
Euskal Encounter	Basque Country, Spain	1994–	Originated as a pure Amiga Demo Party, now a LAN and demo Party
Evoke	Cologne, Germany	1997–	Demoparty organized by Digitale Kultur
Flashback	Sydney, Australia	2011–2015, 2019–	
Flashparty	Buenos Aires, Argentina	1998–2001, 2003–2005, 2007, 2018–	First Demoparty in Latin America
Forever	Horná Súča, Slovakia	2000–	8-bit party, C64, Spectrum and Atari
Function	Budapest, Hungary	2003–2023	
Gardening	Patras, Greece	1995–1997	First demoparty in Greece.
The Gathering	Hamar, Norway	1992–	Norway's largest demoparty, which later became more of a LAN/game-party.
Gubbdata	Lund, Sweden	2012–2022	Amiga/C64 demo party. Organized by Genesis Project.
Hackerence	Härnösand, Sweden	1989–2000	Organized by the youth club ComUn (Computer Union).
Horde	Udine, Italy	2007	A result of a split from the computer event Codex Alpe Adria to focus on the demoscene only.
Icons Artparty	Helsinki, Finland	2007, 2008, 2012	Demoparty and a festival of electronic art.
Inércia Demoparty	Portugal	2001–2006, 2008, 2010, 2012, 2018–	Oldest running Portuguese demoparty.
Kindergarten	Haga, Norway	1994–2014	Used to be the oldest pure demoparty in the world, hasn't been held since 2014.
Last Party	Opalenica, Poland	1997–2003, 2017	Winter Atari copy party.
Lato Ludzików	Opalenica, Poland	1999–2002	Summer Atari copy party.
LayerOne Demoparty	Pasadena, California	2014–	Newish demoparty held every year at the LayerOne Security Conference
Lost Party	Licheń Stary, Poland	2019–	Summer 8-bit demo party.
Lovebyte	Netherlands	2021–	Demoparty dedicated to sizecoding
Mekka & Symposium	Fallingbostel, Germany	1996–2002	One of the most respected demoparties. Part of the organizing staff went on to create Breakpoint.
Movement	Ashkelon, Israel	1995–1998	The yearly demo party of the demoscene in Israel.
NAID	Longueuil, Quebec, Canada	1995–1996	The first, and to date, largest demoparty in North America.
Nordlicht	Bremen, Germany	2012–	First pure demoscene party in Bremen since the Siliconvention in 1997.
NOVA	Exeter, UK	2017–	
Nullarbor	Perth, Australia	2006–2008	
NVScene	San Jose, California, USA	2008, 2014, 2015	Held in conjunction with Nvision (an nVidia conference) in 2008.
Optimise	Johannesburg, South Africa	2000–	The primary SA demo party.
Outline	Ommen, Netherlands	2004–	Atari and all other platforms.
The Party	Aars, Denmark	1991–2002	One of the oldest and largest parties.
Pilgrimage	Salt Lake City, Utah, USA	2003–2005	
QBParty	Sülysáp, Hungary	2015–	On the first weekend after 10 May in each year.
Remedy	Stockholm, Sweden	1995–2001, 2004–2005	
Reunion	Bucharest, Romania	1997–2001	The first demoparty in Romania. It was held in the month of August of each year and it was organized by Virtual Eagle.
Revision	Saarbrücken, Germany	2011–	The world's largest "scene-only" demoparty, successor of the Breakpoint party series.
Rewired	Maaseik, Belgium; Hasselt, Belgium	2008–2014	
Riverwash	Katowice, Poland	2007–2018	
Saturne Party	Paris, France	1993–1997	
Silly Venture	Gdańsk, Poland	2000, 2010–2014, 2016–2019, 2021	Originally exclusively for the Atari scene, since the 2020+1 Summer it has become multiplatform
Solskogen	Flateby, Norway	2002–2020	Started in Ås, Norway, but moved to Flateby in 2013. Close to 200 participants.
Somewhere in Holland	Nijmegen, Netherlands	1993, 1995	Demoparty in The Netherlands.
Sundown	Exeter, UK	2005–2016	The first UK-based party since 1999. Succeeded by the NOVA demoparty.
Syntax Party	Melbourne, Australia	2007–	Melbourne's biggest and (currently) only demoparty.
Takeover	Eindhoven, The Netherlands	1997–2001	The first instalment was named X'97 Takeover, as it was held together with the X party.
The Ultimate Meeting	Griesheim, Germany	1999–2013	One of the biggest German demoparties, initially thought as a warm-up meeting for The Party. It finally moved to the same date as The Party when it was clear that The Party became obsolete.
VIP	Lyon, France	1999–2002, 2008–2019	Organized by PoPsY TeAm, this was the oldest pure demoscene party still ongoing in France.
Wired	Mons, Belgium	1994–1998	
X	Someren, Netherlands	1995–	Commodore 64 party, currently held about every second year. Last one was on June 2–4, 2023. In 1995 and 1996 also a PC demo party, in 1997 combined with Takeover.
Xenium	Katowice, Poland	1999, 2019–	Successor of Riverwash event.

== 64K intro ==
A 64K intro is a demo with an executable file size limit of 64 kibibytes, or 65,536 bytes. This is a traditional limit inherited from the maximum size of a COM file. Demos traditionally were limited by RAM size, or later by storage size. By the early 1990s, demo sizes grew, so categories were created for limited sizes that forced developers to not simply stream data from storage.

To reduce the file size, 64K intros often use executable compression and procedural generation, such as sound synthesis, mesh generation, procedural textures, and procedural animation.

fr-08, a 64k PC demo by Farbrausch released at The Party 2000 in Aars has since been claimed to mark a watershed moment in the popularity of the category. Others include Chaos Theory by Conspiracy (2006), Gaia Machina by Approximate (2012), F — Felix's Workshop by Ctrl-Alt-Test (2012) Fermi paradox by Mercury (2016), and Darkness Lay Your Eyes Upon Me by Conspiracy (2016).

== Awards ==
Every year, awards in the demoscene celebrate the creativity, technical prowess, and artistic vision of demoscene groups and individuals:

- The Scene.org Awards were an annual award presented by Scene.org from 2003 to 2012.
- The Meteoriks are an annual award that happens every year since 2014. The award ceremony is held at Revision.

== Influence ==
Although demos are a rather obscure form of art, even in traditionally active demoscene countries, the scene has influenced areas such as computer games industry and new media art.

Many European game programmers, artists, and musicians have come from the demoscene, often cultivating the learned techniques, practices and philosophies in their work. For example, the Finnish company Remedy Entertainment, known for the Max Payne series of games, was founded by the PC group Future Crew, and most of its employees are former or active Finnish demosceners. Sometimes demos provide direct influence even to game developers that have no demoscene affiliation: for instance, Will Wright names the demoscene as a major influence on the Maxis game Spore, which is largely based on procedural content generation. Similarly, at QuakeCon in 2011, John Carmack noted that he "thinks highly" of people who do 64k intros, as an example of artificial limitations encouraging creative programming. Jerry Holkins from Penny Arcade claimed to have an "abiding love" for the demoscene, and noted that it is "stuff worth knowing".

Certain forms of computer art have a strong affiliation with the demoscene. Tracker music, for example, originated in the Amiga game industry but was soon heavily dominated by demoscene musicians; producer Adam Fielding claims to have tracker/demoscene roots. Currently, there is a major tracking scene separate from the actual demoscene. A form of static computer graphics where demosceners have traditionally excelled is pixel art; see artscene for more information on the related subculture. Origins of creative coding tools like Shadertoy and Three.js can be directly traced back to the scene.

Over the years, desktop computer hardware capabilities have improved by orders of magnitude, and so for most programmers, tight hardware restrictions are no longer a common issue. Nevertheless, demosceners continue to study and experiment with creating impressive effects on limited hardware. Since handheld consoles and cellular phones have comparable processing power or capabilities to the desktop platforms of old (such as low resolution screens which require pixel art, or very limited storage and memory for music replay), many demosceners have been able to apply their niche skills to develop games for these platforms, and earn a living doing so. One particular example is Angry Birds, whose lead designer Jaakko Iisalo was an active and well-known demoscener in the 1990s. Unity Technologies is another notable example; its technical leads on iPhone, Android and Nintendo Switch platforms Renaldas Zioma and Erik Hemming are authors of Suicide Barbie demo for the PlayStation Portable console, which was released in 2007.

Some attempts have been made to increase the familiarity of demos as an art form. For example, there have been demo shows, demo galleries and demoscene-related books, sometimes even TV programs introducing the subculture and its works.

The museum IT-ceum in Linköping, Sweden, has an exhibition about the demoscene.

=== Video game industry ===
4players.de reported that "numerous" demo and intro programmers, artists, and musicians were employed in the games industry by 2007. Video game companies with demoscene members on staff included Digital Illusions, Starbreeze, Ascaron, 49Games, Remedy, Housemarque, IO Interactive, Techland, Lionhead Studios, Bugbear, Digital Reality, Guerrilla Games, and Akella.

The tracker music which is part of demoscene culture could be found in many video games of the late 1980s to early 2000s, such as Lemmings, Jazz Jackrabbit, One Must Fall: 2097, Crusader: No Remorse, the Unreal series, Deus Ex, Bejeweled, and Uplink.

== See also ==
- Algorithmic composition
- Computer art scene
- Hacker subculture
- Minimalism (computing)
- Netlabel
- Crack intro

=== Platforms ===
- Amiga demos
- Commodore 64 demos
- ZX Spectrum demos
- MacHack

=== Software ===
- GrafX2
- OpenMPT
- Protracker
- FastTracker 2
- Scream Tracker

=== Websites ===
- Demozoo
- Scene.org
- Mod Archive
- Atari Scene
