= Demogroup =

Group of demoscene creators

Demogroups are teams of demosceners, who make computer based audio-visual works of art known as demos. Demogroups form a subculture collectively known as the demoscene.

Groups frequently consist of students, young computer enthusiasts who spend days coding their demos. They often have a pseudonym (called a "handle" or "nick"), usually chained together with the name of their group (in formats like "Scener of Demo Group" or "Scener/DG"). Demosceners rarely use their real names in demoscene contexts. This is a tradition originating from the demoscene's roots, where small demos were distributed along with cracked software, usually computer games.

Many demogroups have been founded by friends who already knew each other in real life. However, there have also been groups that have taken their form online via Bulletin Board Systems or the Internet. Perhaps the most important way for demogroups to communicate is IRC. Demosceners from different groups also meet each other in real life at demoparties and smaller meetings.

Demogroups often bear resemblances to corporate companies: demogroups incorporate wordmarks, logos, catchphrases, and slogans for their promotion. It is very important for a demogroup to have good PR, and major groups have dedicated group organisers who are responsible for "managing the group's human resources", i.e. nag the members who slack off. Some groups also treat the recruitment of new members with great care, often applying "trial periods" in which the new member has to prove themself to be worthy. However these practices are often just intentional exaggeration (often tongue-in-cheek), to maintain an "elite" image for the group.

A group is perhaps the most important social unit in the demoscene, and belonging to a group is often considered more or less synonymous to being a demoscener. Even individual productions, with no group activity involved, are typically associated with the group of the creative individual. There have even been several "one-man groups" when an individual demomaker with no group has wanted to release a demo or intro.

== Demography ==
As of 2006, the countries with the most active demogroups and demoparties are the Nordic countries (Norway, Sweden, Finland, and Denmark), Germany, the Netherlands, Hungary and France.

Due to the community-like nature of the demoscene, multi-national demogroups are not uncommon.

== Demoscener functions ==
Demosceners specialize themselves into various categories to be able to take part in the demomaking process. A few people are able to cross over between multiple archetypes (e.g. coder-musician, musician-designer), but this is by no means a trend.

=== Coder ===
The coder is the demogroup's programmer who creates the demo's software framework and is responsible for the actual realtime state of the demo. While some coders specialize in developing system-level functionality (such as providing wrappers and APIs for other coders to base their code on), others code effects which are usually visual representations of mathematical formulas, such as fractals or metaballs.

In the 1990s, coders were most often entirely responsible for the demo's flow and arrangement, including the effect's synchronization to the music and sometimes even the design. Nowadays, software tools known as demotools are widely used, allowing this work to be done by a designer who does not have to be a coder. Many groups, however, still prefer that the coder takes most of the responsibility in the demomaking process, including the design.

In many cases, an attempt for excelling in several areas has resulted in one area outshadowing the others: for instance, coders who try to make music often come up with "coder music" which may be technically passable but lacks artistic ambitions. "Coder graphics" and "coder palettes" are similar terms for graphics and color schemes.

=== Graphic artist ===
Graphic artists (or graphicians in scene lingo) create the visual coherency behind a demo, which include still pictures, design elements, fonts, colors, 3D objects, textures and animation.

Originally, there was a single type of graphician creating typical 2D graphics (referred to as pixeled graphics because they were typically created pixel by pixel). Ever since demos started using complex (as in, much more elaborate than cubes and donuts) 3D graphics, graphicians that exclusively model 3D graphics are also around, sometimes referred to as (3D) modelers.

=== Musicians ===
Musicians are responsible for the composing, arranging, mixing and mastering (and in some cases, performing) the soundtracks and sound effects in the demo.

In the older days, musicians worked with trackers, and the world of tracked music was heavily dominated by demoscene musicians. In later times, it became possible for the PC demos to use streaming, high-quality music formats, and the musicians started to gradually change their tools to professional music sequencers. However, tracked music and other specialized formats still continue to be used in size-restricted intros as well as demos written for more restrictive platforms such as mobile devices and vintage computers.

== Fake groups ==
Demosceners often form fake groups, which are essentially secret identities for making humorous or vulgar productions without scathing their original reputation - people in a fake group hide behind a pseudonym (which, considering their demoscene handles, usually becomes a pseudo-pseudonym). This type of masquerading is often just performed to confuse naïve newcomers to the scene; while some fake identities are never revealed for their time of activity, in most cases a large portion of unrelated people are aware of the real persons behind the spoof.

== "One-man" groups ==
Though they are not strictly "demogroups" by definition, the scene always had various individuals who excelled in all areas of demomaking; rather than gathering various other persons to aid them in a creative process, they do all of the programming, music making and visual art themselves. While the obvious disadvantage of this type of working is the multiple of amount of work one must do with a given quality standard, one-man groups usually point out that having no others to work with gets rid of discussions and creative differences alike, and is actually a very free way of working.

One-man groups are usually treated with a mix of respect and curiosity within the scene, because they're not an extremely common phenomenon, and some of the scene marks them as an unnecessary effort for virtuosity, largely because it is virtually impossible to perform above average in all areas - one-man demos and intros usually bear obvious lacks in given areas, depending on whether the creator was more a coder, graphician or musician, who adapted other skillsets later.

Perhaps the most successful one-man army of the demoscene is Dmitry "AND" Andreev, two-time winner of the Assembly demo party in the 64k intro category.

== See also ==
- Social group
- Warez group
