= FXP =

FXP may refer to:

- File eXchange Protocol
- Franky Perez, American musician
- FXP Preset, for Virtual Studio Technology
- FXP (production company), the production arm of cable networks FX and FXX
