= Clickjacking =

Malicious technique of tricking a Web user

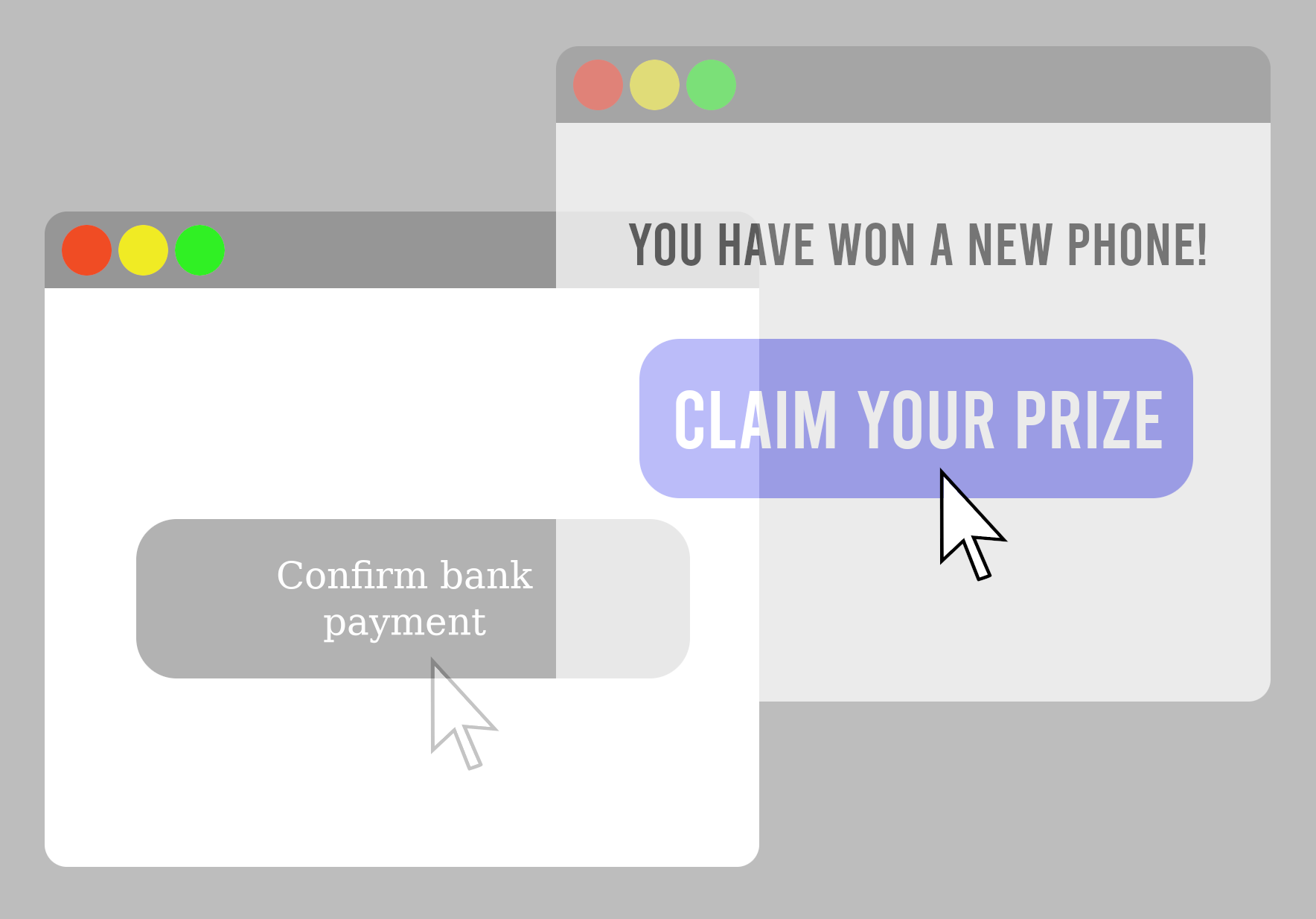
In a clickjacking attack, the user is presented with a false interface, where their input is applied to something they cannot see.

Clickjacking (classified as a user interface redress attack or UI redressing) is a malicious technique of tricking a user into clicking on something different from what the user perceives, thus potentially revealing confidential information or allowing others to take control of their computer while clicking on seemingly innocuous objects, including web pages.

Clickjacking is an instance of the confused deputy problem, wherein a computer is tricked into misusing its authority.

== History ==
In 2002, it had been noted that it was possible to load a transparent layer over a web page and have the user's input affect the transparent layer without the user noticing. However, fixes only started to trickle in around 2004, and the general problem was mostly ignored as a major issue until 2008.

In 2008, Jeremiah Grossman and Robert Hansen (of SecTheory) had discovered that Adobe Flash Player was able to be clickjacked, allowing an attacker to gain access to a user's computer without the user's knowledge. Grossman and Hansen coined the term "clickjacking", a portmanteau of the words "click" and "hijacking".

As more attacks of a similar nature were discovered, the focus of the term "UI redressing" was changed to describe the category of these attacks, rather than just clickjacking itself.

== Description ==
One form of clickjacking takes advantage of vulnerabilities that are present in applications or web pages to allow the attacker to manipulate the user's computer for their own advantage.

For example, a clickjacked page tricks a user into performing undesired actions by clicking on concealed links. On a clickjacked page, the attackers load another page over the original page in a transparent layer to trick the user into taking actions, the outcomes of which will not be the same as the user expects. The unsuspecting users think that they are clicking visible buttons, while they are actually performing actions on the invisible page, clicking buttons of the page below the layer. The hidden page may be an authentication page; therefore, the attackers can trick users into performing actions which the users never intended. There is no way of tracing such actions to the attackers later, as the users would have been genuinely authenticated on the hidden page.

== Clickjacking categories ==
- Classic: works mostly through a web browser
- Likejacking: utilizes Facebook's social media capabilities
- Nested: clickjacking tailored to affect Google+
- Cursorjacking: manipulates the cursor's appearance and location
- MouseJacking: inject keyboard or mouse input via remote RF link
- Browserless: does not use a browser
- Cookiejacking: acquires cookies from browsers
- Filejacking: capable of setting up the affected device as a file server
- Password manager attack: clickjacking that utilizes a vulnerability in the autofill capability of browsers

=== Classic ===
Classic clickjacking refers to a situation when an attacker uses hidden layers on web pages to manipulate the actions a user's cursor does, resulting in misleading the user about what truly is being clicked on.

A user might receive an email with a link to a video about a news item, but another webpage, say a product page on Amazon, can be "hidden" on top or underneath the "PLAY" button of the news video. The user tries to "play" the video but actually "buys" the product from Amazon. The hacker can only send a single click, so they rely on the fact that the visitor is both logged into Amazon and has 1-click ordering enabled.

While technical implementation of these attacks may be challenging due to cross-browser incompatibilities, a number of tools such as BeEF or Metasploit Project offer almost fully automated exploitation of clients on vulnerable websites. Clickjacking may be facilitated by – or may facilitate – other web attacks, such as XSS.

=== Likejacking ===
Likejacking is a malicious technique of tricking users viewing a website into "liking" a Facebook page or other social media posts/accounts that they did not intentionally mean to "like". The term "likejacking" came from a comment posted by Corey Ballou in the article How to "Like" Anything on the Web (Safely), which is one of the first documented postings explaining the possibility of malicious activity regarding Facebook's "like" button.

According to an article in IEEE Spectrum, a solution to likejacking was developed at one of Facebook's hackathons. A "Like" bookmarklet is available that avoids the possibility of likejacking present in the Facebook like button.

=== Nested ===
Nested clickjacking, compared to classic clickjacking, works by embedding a malicious web frame between two frames of the original, harmless web page: that from the framed page and that which is displayed on the top window. This works due to a vulnerability in the HTTP header X-Frame-Options, in which, when this element has the value SAMEORIGIN, the web browser only checks the two aforementioned layers. The fact that additional frames can be added in between these two while remaining undetected means that attackers can use this for their benefit.

In the past, with Google+ and the faulty version of X-Frame-Options, attackers were able to insert frames of their choice by using the vulnerability present in Google's Image Search engine. In between the image display frames, which were present in Google+ as well, these attacker-controlled frames were able to load and not be restricted, allowing for the attackers to mislead whomever came upon the image display page.

=== Cursorjacking ===
CursorJacking is a UI redressing technique to change the cursor from the location the user perceives, discovered in 2010 by Eddy Bordi, a researcher at vulnerability.fr. Marcus Niemietz demonstrated this with a custom cursor icon, and in 2012 Mario Heiderich did so by hiding the cursor.

Jordi Chancel, a researcher at Alternativ-Testing.fr, discovered a CursorJacking vulnerability using Flash, HTML and JavaScript code in Mozilla Firefox on Mac OS X systems (fixed in Firefox 30.0) which can lead to arbitrary code execution and webcam spying.

A second CursorJacking vulnerability was again discovered by Jordi Chancel in Mozilla Firefox on Mac OS X systems (fixed in Firefox 37.0) using once again Flash, HTML and JavaScript code which can also lead to spying via a webcam and the execution of a malicious addon, allowing the execution of malware on the affected user's computer.

=== MouseJack ===
Different from other clickjacking techniques that redress a UI, MouseJack is a wireless hardware-based UI vulnerability first reported by Marc Newlin of Bastille.net in 2016 which allows external keyboard input to be injected into vulnerable dongles. Logitech supplied firmware patches but other manufacturers failed to respond to this vulnerability.

=== Browserless ===
In Browserless clickjacking, attackers utilize vulnerabilities in programs to replicate classic clickjacking in them, without being required to use the presence of a web browser.

This method of clickjacking is mainly prevalent among mobile devices, usually on Android devices, especially due to the way in which toast notifications work. Because toast notifications have a small delay in between the moment the notification is requested and the moment the notification actually displays on-screen, attackers are capable of using that gap to create a dummy button that lies hidden underneath the notification and can still be clicked on.

=== CookieJacking ===
CookieJacking is a form of clickjacking in which cookies are stolen from the victim's web browsers. This is done by tricking the user into dragging an object which seemingly appears harmless but is in fact making the user select the entire content of the cookie being targeted. From there, the attacker can acquire the cookie and all of the data that it possesses.

=== FileJacking ===
In fileJacking, attackers use the web browser's capability to navigate through the computer and access computer files in order to acquire personal data. It does so by tricking the user into establishing an active file server (through the file and folder selection window that browsers use). With this, attackers can now access and take files from their victims' computers.

=== Password manager attack ===
A 2014 paper from researcher at the Carnegie Mellon University found that while browsers refuse to autofill if the protocol on the current login page is different from the protocol at the time the password was saved, some password managers would insecurely fill in passwords for the http version of https-saved passwords. Most managers did not protect against iFrame- and redirection-based attacks and exposed additional passwords where password synchronization had been used between multiple devices.

== Prevention ==
=== Client-side ===
==== NoScript ====
Protection against clickjacking (including likejacking) can be added to Mozilla Firefox desktop and mobile versions by installing the NoScript add-on: its ClearClick feature, released on 8 October 2008, prevents users from clicking on invisible or "redressed" page elements of embedded documents or applets. According to Google's "Browser Security Handbook" from 2008, NoScript's ClearClick is a "freely available product that offers a reasonable degree of protection" against Clickjacking. Protection from the newer cursorjacking attack was added to NoScript 2.2.8 RC1.

==== NoClickjack ====
The "NoClickjack" web browser add-on (browser extension) adds client-side clickjack protection for users of Google Chrome, Mozilla Firefox, Opera and Microsoft Edge without interfering with the operation of legitimate iFrames. NoClickjack is based on technology developed for GuardedID. The NoClickjack add-on is free of charge.

==== GuardedID ====
GuardedID (a commercial product) includes client-side clickjack protection for users of Internet Explorer without interfering with the operation of legitimate iFrames. GuardedID clickjack protection forces all frames to become visible. GuardedID teams with the add-on NoClickjack to add protection for Google Chrome, Mozilla Firefox, Opera and Microsoft Edge.

==== Gazelle ====
Gazelle is a Microsoft Research project secure web browser based on IE, that uses an OS-like security model and has its own limited defenses against clickjacking. In Gazelle, a window of different origin may only draw dynamic content over another window's screen space if the content it draws is opaque.

==== Intersection Observer v2 ====
The Intersection Observer v2 API introduces the concept of tracking the actual "visibility" of a target element as a human being would define it. This allows a framed widget to detect when it's being covered. The feature is enabled by default since Google Chrome 74, released in April 2019. The API is also implemented by other Chromium-based browsers, such as Microsoft Edge and Opera.

=== Server-side ===
==== Framekiller ====
Web site owners can protect their users against UI redressing (frame based clickjacking) on the server side by including a framekiller JavaScript snippet in those pages they do not want to be included inside frames from different sources.

Such JavaScript-based protection is not always reliable. This is especially true on Internet Explorer, where this kind of countermeasure can be circumvented "by design" by including the targeted page inside an <IFRAME SECURITY=restricted> element.

==== X-Frame-Options ====
Introduced in 2009 in Internet Explorer 8 was a new HTTP header X-Frame-Options which offered a partial protection against clickjacking and was adopted by other browsers (Safari, Firefox, Chrome, and Opera) shortly afterwards. The header, when set by website owner, declares its preferred framing policy: values of DENY, ALLOW-FROM origin, or SAMEORIGIN will prevent any framing, framing by external sites, or allow framing only by the specified site, respectively. In addition to that, some advertising sites return a non-standard ALLOWALL value with the intention to allow framing their content on any page (equivalent of not setting X-Frame-Options at all).

In 2013 the X-Frame-Options header has been officially published as RFC 7034, but is not an Internet standard. The document is provided for informational purposes only. The W3C's Content Security Policy Level 2 Recommendation provides an alternative security directive, frame-ancestors, which is intended to obsolete the X-Frame-Options header.

A security header like X-Frame-Options will not protect users against clickjacking attacks that are not using a frame.

==== Content Security Policy ====
The frame-ancestors directive of Content Security Policy (introduced in version 1.1) can allow or disallow embedding of content by potentially hostile pages using iframe, object, etc. This directive obsoletes the X-Frame-Options directive. If a page is served with both headers, the frame-ancestors policy should be preferred by the browser, although this requirement was ignored by older versions of some browsers.

Example frame-ancestors policies:

# Disallow embedding. All iframes etc. will be blank, or contain a browser specific error page.
Content-Security-Policy: frame-ancestors 'none'

# Allow embedding of own content only.
Content-Security-Policy: frame-ancestors 'self'

# Allow specific origins to embed this content
Content-Security-Policy: frame-ancestors www.example.com www.wikipedia.org

== See also ==
- Mousetrapping
- Browser security
- Click fraud
- Cross-site scripting
- Drive-by download
- Internet safety
- Internet security
- Malvertising
- Phishing
- Security hacker
- Social jacking
