= File exchange =

File exchange can refer to

- File eXchange Protocol, a protocol for remotely connecting two computers.
- File exchange service sites for exchanging files that are too large for email attachments.
