= UploadFTP =

Type of software

- Developer: Brightek Software
- Stable release: 2.0.1 / August 14, 2011; 14 years ago
- Written in: C# .NET v4.0
- Operating system: Windows XP, Vista, 7, 8
- Available in: Multilingual
- Type: FTP client
- License: Proprietary

UploadFTP was an FTP/SFTP/FTPS/FTPES/FXP client for Windows, developed by Brightek Software. The product has been discontinued, and the company website is no longer online. UploadFTP was shareware and a freeware version UploadFTP Free was also available with some restrictions.

== Features ==
Support FXP
Allows a user to transfer files directly from server to server using drag&drop
Data in the Cloud
User settings such as data of added servers, trusted certificates and so on are stored on-line and can be access from everywhere
Synchronize & Schedule
User can create a sync session to make his file up-to-date or a task for scheduler to perform routine work
Edit on-the-go
No more need to download file first and upload them after editing, with this feature user can edit file with two clicks
Built-in search engine
Search files through over a 4000 FTP servers with 850 TB total content

== See also ==
- File Transfer Protocol
