= GNOSIS =

- Developer: Tymshare (Norm Hardy, Bill Frantz, Charlie Landau); McDonnell Douglas
- Written in: C
- OS family: Capability-based
- Working state: Discontinued
- Initial release: 1977; 48 years ago
- Final release: Final / 1988; 37 years ago
- Marketing target: Research
- Available in: English
- Update method: Compile from source code
- Platforms: S/370 mainframe
- Kernel type: Microkernel
- Default user interface: Command-line interface
- Succeeded by: KeyKOS, Extremely Reliable Operating System (EROS)
- Official website: cap-lore.com/CapTheory/KK

Great New Operating System In the Sky (GNOSIS) is a capability-based operating system that was researched during the 1970s at Tymshare, Inc. It was based on the research of Norman Hardy, Dale E. Jordan, Bill Frantz, Charlie Landau, Jay Jonekait, et al. It provided a foundation for the development of future operating systems such as KeyKOS, EROS, CapROS, and Coyotos. In 1984, McDonnell Douglas acquired Tymshare, and a year later sold GNOSIS to Key Logic, where GNOSIS was renamed KeyKOS.
