= UNCOL =

UNCOL (Universal Computer Oriented Language) is a universal intermediate language for compilers. The idea was introduced in 1958, by a SHARE ad-hoc committee. It was never fully specified or implemented; in many ways it was more a concept than a language.

UNCOL was intended to make compilers economically available for each new instruction set architecture and programming language, thereby reducing an N×M problem to N+M. Each machine architecture would require just one compiler back end, and each programming language would require one compiler front end. This was a very ambitious goal because compiler technology was in its infancy, and little was standardized in computer hardware and software.

== History ==
The concept of such a universal intermediate language is old: the SHARE report (1958) already says "[it has] been discussed by many independent persons as long ago as 1954." Macrakis (1993) summarizes its fate:

UNCOL was an ambitious effort for the early 1960s. An attempt to solve the compiler-writing problem, it ultimately failed because language and compiler technology were not yet mature. In the 1970s, compiler-compilers ultimately contributed to solving the problem that UNCOL set itself: the economical production of compilers for new languages and new machines.

UNCOL is sometimes used as a generic term for the idea of a universal intermediate language. The Architecture Neutral Distribution Format is an example of an UNCOL in this sense, as are various bytecode systems such as UCSD Pascal's p-code, and most notably Java bytecode.

== See also ==
- LLVM
- GIMPLE
