= Codasip =

Processor technology company

- Type: Private
- Industry: Hardware, Internet of Things, RISC, Semiconductor
- Founded: 2014
- Founder: Karel Masařík
- Headquarters: Munich, Germany
- Key people: Ron Black (CEO); Karel Masařík (President); Zdeněk Přikryl (CTO); Vladimír Koutný (CFO); Kateřina Smrčková (CPO); Brett Cline (CCO)
- Website: codasip.com

Codasip (abrev. CO-Design Application-Specific Instruction-set Processor) is a processor technology company enabling system-on-chip developers to differentiate their products. The company specializes in RISC-V processor technologies and offers Codasip Studio, a tool suite for processor design using the CodAL architecture description language.

The company's headquarters are in Munich, Germany. Codasip has claimed that there are more than 2 billion processor cores that have been produced using their technology.

== History ==
In 2014, Codasip was founded on the basis of Karel Masařík's PhD work on a distinct hardware/software co-design technology, after a decade of intensive research at Brno University of Technology.

In the same year, the company secured a seed funding round of $4.5M, led by Credo Ventures.

In 2015, Codasip co-founded RISC-V International (initially known as RISC-V Foundation) and also launched the first commercial RISC-V processor IP on the market.

In 2017, Codasip unveiled its first 64-bit RISC-V core.

In 2018, Codasip completed a Series A investment round, raising $10M from private equity firms.

In 2020, the company received funding from the European Union's Horizon 2020 program.

In the same year, Codasip opened a strategic design center in France followed by another in the United Kingdom in 2021. That same year, Ron Black assumed the role of CEO.

In 2022, Codasip established design centers in Greece and Spain and acquired Cerberus, a UK-based firm known for its expertise in crafting secure IoT products.

In June, Codasip was awarded the "Best in Show" in the Processors & IP category at the Embedded World 2022 event.

In December, Codasip received additional financial support from the European Innovation Council, a segment of the European Union.

Also, the company was featured in EE Times' esteemed "Silicon 100" list consecutively in 2022 and 2023.

In 2024 Codasip released the X730, a 64-bit application class RISC-V CPU which implements the CHERI security technology.
