= Anita K. Jones =

American computer scientist and former U.S. government official

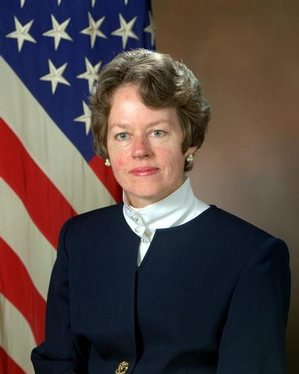
- Anita K. Jones (1993)
- Born: March 10, 1942 (age 84); Fort Worth, Texas
- Education: Rice University (A.B. in Mathematics, 1964); University of Texas at Austin (M.A. in English Literature, 1968); Carnegie Mellon University (Ph.D. in Computer Science, 1973)
- Occupations: computer scientist, professor, government official
- Known for: Director of Defense Research and Engineering of the U.S. Department of Defense
- Spouse: William Wulf
- Children: 2
- Website: engineering.virginia.edu/faculty/anita-jones

Anita Katherine Jones (born March 10, 1942) is an American computer scientist and former U.S. government official. She was Director, Defense Research and Engineering from 1993 to 1997.

Jones was elected a member of the National Academy of Engineering (1994) for contributions to the theory and implementation of software systems and for extensive public service.

== Early life ==
Jones' father, a petroleum engineer, encouraged her to pursue a career that would make a difference in the world. He taught her to play chess, helped her on geometry problems, and on weekends took her and her younger brother fishing for catfish, red snapper, and trout on Galveston Bay. Jones' mother, who had trained as a ballerina and danced in several Hollywood films, taught her daughter a love of painting.

Born in Fort Worth, Texas and raised in Houston, Anita graduated as valedictorian of her high school class in 1960.

== Education ==
Jones received an A.B. from Rice University in Mathematics in 1964, a Master of Arts in English Literature from the University of Texas at Austin, in 1968, and a Ph.D. in computer science from Carnegie Mellon University in 1973. While at Carnegie Mellon, she met her future husband, William A. Wulf.

== Career ==
Jones remained at Carnegie Mellon as an assistant professor, with promotion to associate professor in 1978. With William A. Wulf, her husband, Jones was a founder and vice president of Tartan Laboratories, a compiler technology company, in 1981. The company was later sold to Texas Instruments.

She joined the faculty of the University of Virginia in 1989, but took leave in June 1993 to become the Director of Defense Research and Engineering for the U.S. Department of Defense, a position in which she was responsible for the management of the science and technology program. Her responsibilities included the Defense Advanced Research Projects Agency and oversight of the Department of Defense laboratories, as well as being the principal advisor to the Secretary of Defense for defense-related scientific and technical matters. At the time, it was the highest technical job ever held by a woman in the Department of Defense. She returned to the University of Virginia in 1997. In the field of computer software systems and cyber-security, Dr. Jones has published more than 40 technical articles and two books.

Among other things, she gave the Defense Modeling and Simulation Office (DMSO) the task of “assuring interoperability and reusability of defense models and simulations" which led to DMSO formulating a vision for modeling and simulation and establishing a modeling and simulation masterplan, including the High Level Architecture.

In 2010, she officially retired but remains involved in the university and continues to mentor young women in technical fields.

She is on the Board of Trustees for In-Q-Tel which "is the not-for-profit strategic investor that accelerates the development and delivery of cutting-edge technologies to national security agencies."

=== Board memberships ===
Since 2004, Jones has been a member of the MIT Corporation. From 1988 to 1992, she was a trustee of the MITRE Corporation. She is a member of the National Academy of Engineering, the Council on Foreign Relations, the National Science Foundation's National Science Board, and the American Philosophical Society. She has been a member of the Computing Community Consortium "since its inception."

=== Awards ===
Jones received the Augusta Ada Lovelace Award from the Association of Women in Computing in 2004. She is also the recipient of the Computing Research Association's Service Award, the Air Force Meritorious Civilian Service Award, and the Department of Defense Award for Distinguished Public Service. The U.S. Navy has named a seamount in the North Pacific Ocean (51° 25’ N and 159° 10’ W) for her.

In 2007, she was the recipient of the IEEE Founders Medal.

Jones was also awarded the American Association for the Advancement of Science (AAAS)'s 2012 Philip Hauge Abelson award. This award recognizes public servants who have contributed substantially to advancing science. Jones was awarded the AAAS Philip Hauge Abelson Award for her public service roles throughout her career, including her roles on the National Science Board, the National Academies' Policy Division Advisory Council, and the DOD Defense Science Board.
