= KeyKOS =

- Developer: Tymshare (Norm Hardy, Bill Frantz, Charlie Landau); McDonnell Douglas; Key Logic
- Written in: C
- OS family: Capability-based
- Working state: Discontinued
- Initial release: 1977; 49 years ago
- Latest release: Final / 1988; 38 years ago
- Marketing target: Research
- Available in: English
- Update method: Compile from source code
- Supported platforms: S/370 mainframe
- Kernel type: Microkernel
- Default user interface: Command-line interface
- Preceded by: GNOSIS
- Succeeded by: Extremely Reliable Operating System (EROS), CapROS, Coyotos
- Official website: cap-lore.com/CapTheory/KK

KeyKOS is a persistent, pure capability-based operating system for the IBM S/370 mainframe computers. It allows emulating the environments of VM, MVS, and Portable Operating System Interface (POSIX). It is a predecessor of the Extremely Reliable Operating System (EROS), and its successor operating systems, CapROS, and Coyotos. KeyKOS is a nanokernel-based operating system.

In the mid-1970s, development of KeyKOS began at Tymshare, Inc., under the name GNOSIS. In 1984, McDonnell Douglas (MD) bought Tymshare. A year later MD spun off Key Logic, which bought GNOSIS and renamed it KeyKOS.
