= Tartan Laboratories =

- Type: Privately held
- Industry: Computer software
- Founded: 1981; 45 years ago
- Founder: William A. Wulf; Anita K. Jones; John Nestor
- Fate: Acquired in 1996; 30 years ago
- Successors: Texas Instruments; DDC-I; Tartan Software; Tartan Ada LLC
- Headquarters: Pittsburgh, Pennsylvania, United States
- Products: Language compilers
- Revenue: about $8 million
- Number of employees: about 80

Tartan Laboratories, Inc., later renamed Tartan, Inc., was an American software company founded in 1981 and based in Pittsburgh, Pennsylvania, that specialized in programming language compilers, especially for the language Ada. It was based on work initially done at Carnegie Mellon University and gradually shifted from a focus on research and contract work to being more product-oriented. It was sold to Texas Instruments in 1996. Part of it was later acquired by DDC-I in 1998.

== Company founding and initial history ==
Tartan was founded 1981 by Carnegie Mellon University computer science professors and husband and wife William A. Wulf and Anita K. Jones, with the goal of specializing in optimizing compilers. He was chair, president, and CEO while she was vice president of engineering. The professors left the university as part of this action, but still kept a reference to it, as "Tartan" is the name associated with Carnegie Mellon's athletic teams and school newspaper. A third CMU professor was also a founder, John Nestor, a visiting professor who had previously worked at Intermetrics on the finalist "Red" candidate for the Ada language design.

Initial funding for the company was provided by a New York-based venture capital firm, but a second round came from the Pittsburgh-based PNC Financial Corporation. The Cleveland-based Morgenthaler Ventures was another early investor, with David Morgenthaler serving on Tartan's board of directors.

The company's offices were initially located in a former industrial warehouse on Melwood Avenue in the Oakland neighborhood of Pittsburgh. In 1983 the company hosted a visit by Governor of Pennsylvania Dick Thornburgh as part of a meeting of the Pittsburgh High Technology Council, an organization seeking to help change Pittsburgh from its former reliance on an industrial base of steel production to one that included an emphasis on high-technology.

Tartan's initial engineering focus was to commercialize use of the Production Quality Compiler-Compiler Project approach towards building optimizing compilers that Wulf had worked on at Carnegie Mellon. This involved having optimizing code generators semi-automatically produced from architecture descriptions. Tartan made native Ada compilers for VAX/VMS and Sun-3/SunOS, and embedded system Ada cross-compilers, hosted on those platforms, to the MIL-STD-1750A, Motorola 680x0, and later Intel i960 architectures. In addition, in March 1982, the company received a contract to maintain and enhance the DIANA intermediate representation that was intended as the cornerstone to various Ada tools.

Tartan also produced compilers for the languages C and Modula-2. Among the C compiler implementers there were Guy L. Steele Jr. and Samuel P. Harbison, who combined to publish C: A Reference Manual (1984) to provide a precise description of the language, which Tartan was trying to implement on a wide range of systems. Both authors participated in the ANSI C standardization process; several revisions of the book were subsequently issued to reflect the new standard. In addition, Tartan created a microcode compiler for Intel Corporation, the goal of which was to produce microcode that was more efficient than what could be done by hand-coding.

After a while Wulf assumed the role of chairman and senior vice president for development. By early 1985, Tartan had some 60 employees, a payroll over $2 million, and had seen over $9 million invested by capital venture outfits. The company was considered one of the Pittsburgh area's foremost high-technology firms and part of, as The Pittsburgh Press put it, "changing [the city's] image as a smokestack wasteland". Tartan hosted an ACM SIGAda conference in Pittsburgh in July 1986.

In 1987, Tartan and integrated development environment maker Rational began a collaboration in producing a joint product for the 1750A, using Tartan's code generators. Indeed, the Ada 1750A product generated very efficient code and established a strong reputation in the industry. By 1987, the company had received $11 million in venture capital funding.

Both of the key founders would then leave Tartan: Jones in 1987 and Wulf followed in 1988. Both went on to distinguished further careers in government settings and at the University of Virginia.

== Change of emphasis and name ==
Starting in 1985, Tartan had developed a relationship with Texas Instruments, and then in 1988 a main focus of the company became the development of Ada cross-compilers for digital signal processing (DSP) chips. These were for the Texas Instruments TMS320 series, specifically the C3x and C4x lines of processors. Within a few years, Tartan would become the first company to validate Ada compilers for DSPs.

As the 1980s came to a close there were manifest problems at Tartan Laboratories. Delays in getting products ready, or trouble in selling them if they were, had caused revenue shortfalls and most revenue came from contract development work. By 1989 Tartan had consumed some $15 million in venture funding but had never posted a profitable quarter. The Pittsburgh Post-Gazette characterized Tartan as a "promising young startup that never really got off the ground." Donald Evans, president and CEO, said that developing compilers for multiple languages had likely been a bad strategy and said that the company would now focus on selling Ada compilers to the government, military, and related sectors. At the same time, the company relocated its offices in 1989 out of the city to Monroeville, Pennsylvania. (The Oakland facility later became the home of Pittsburgh Filmmakers.)

Following the retirement of Evans, in 1990 Lee B. Ehrlichman became president and CEO. He changed the name of the company to Tartan, Inc., saying that the old name suggested a research organization rather than a for-profit enterprise. He reduced engineering headcount and increased those for marketing and sales, and vowed that the company would focus on three major compiler lines, including ones for the C3x and i960 where there were no immediate competitors. By this point, Tartan had around 70 employees and an estimated annual revenue of $7–8 million. Tartan had staff members who were prominent in the Ada language definition and standardization world, including Erhard Ploedereder and Joyce L. Tokar. The company also had a lead role in the U.S. Air Force-sponsored Common Ada Runtime System (CARTS) project towards providing standard interfaces into Ada runtime environments.

By the mid-1990s Tartan employed over 80 professional staff. Ehrlichman stayed as CEO until 1995, after which he was followed by Jaime Ellertson.

== Sale and later history ==
Tartan was sold to Texas Instruments in 1996. The deal focused on Tartan's role in developing applications for the Texas Instruments DSPs.

In March 1998, DDC-I acquired from Texas Instruments the development and sales and marketing rights to the Tartan Ada cross-compilers for the MIL-STD-1750A, Motorola 680x0, and Intel i960 architectures. These were compilers for processors that Texas Instruments had become less interested in. DDC-I kept the Tartan Ada compilers as a listed product into the 2010s.

Texas Instruments initially kept the Ada cross-compilers for the DSP architectures. In 2003 it closed down the Monroeville facility, which by that time had under 50 employees, and relocated the work to several of its offices around the world.

Subsequently, Texas Instruments licensed the remaining Ada compilers, for Texas Instruments C3x/C4x DSPs, to Tartan Software, Inc. doing business in Fombell, Pennsylvania. Then in 2018, the Tartan Ada product line for C3x/C4x was acquired by Tartan Ada LLC, doing business in New Kensington, Pennsylvania, which offers support maintenance and runtime licensing for the products.
