= Inter-server =

Communication between different servers

In computer network protocol design, inter-server communication is an extension of the client–server model in which data are exchanged directly between servers. In some fields server-to-server (S2S) is used as an alternative, and the term inter-domain can in some cases be used interchangeably.

== Protocols ==
Protocols that have inter-server functions as well as the regular client–server communications include the following:

- IPsec, secure network protocol that can be used to secure a host-to-host connection
- The domain name system (DNS), which uses an inter-server protocol for zone transfers;
- The Dynamic Host Configuration Protocol (DHCP);
- FXP, allowing file transfer directly between FTP servers;
- The Inter-Asterisk eXchange (IAX);
- InterMUD;
- The IRC, an Internet chat system with an inter-server protocol allowing clients to be distributed across many servers;
- The Network News Transfer Protocol (NNTP);
- The Protocol for SYnchronous Conferencing (PSYC);
- SIP, a signaling protocol commonly used for Voice over IP;
- SILC, a secure Internet conferencing protocol;
- The Extensible Messaging and Presence Protocol (XMPP, formerly named Jabber).
- ActivityPub a client/server API for creating, updating and deleting content, as well as a federated server-to-server API for delivering notifications and content.
- SMTP which accepts both MUA->MTA traffic, as well as MTA->MTA, but it is usually recommended that different ports are used for these actions

Some of these protocols employ multicast strategies to efficiently deliver information to multiple servers at once.

== See also ==
- Overlay network
