= Glftpd =

FTP server software

glFTPd
- Developer: glFTPd development team
- Stable release: 2.14a (openssl-3.0.12) / December 28, 2023; 2 years ago
- Preview release: 2.13 BETA1 (openssl-3.0.7) / November 21, 2022; 3 years ago
- Written in: C
- Operating system: Cross-platform
- Platform: Linux, OpenBSD, FreeBSD, Mac OS
- Type: FTP server
- License: glFTPd license
- Website: glftpd.io

glFTPd is a freely available FTP server which runs on Unix, Linux, and BSD operating systems. It has number of features, like logins restricted by a particular set of IP addresses, transfer quotas per-user and per-group basis, and user/groups not stored in the system files, which make it attractive to private warez servers, including topsites. It does have legitimate uses though—a number of web development books recommend it amongst other general purpose FTP servers, and some Linux certification exams of SAIR required knowledge of it. It can integrate with Eggdrop through IRC channels.

== History ==
glFTPd stands for GreyLine File Transfer Protocol Daemon. It was named after the initial developer GreyLine. The first public release of glFTPd dates back to the beginning of 1998. glFTPd is well known for its detailed user permissions, extensive scripting features and for securely and efficiently transferring files between other sites using FXP.

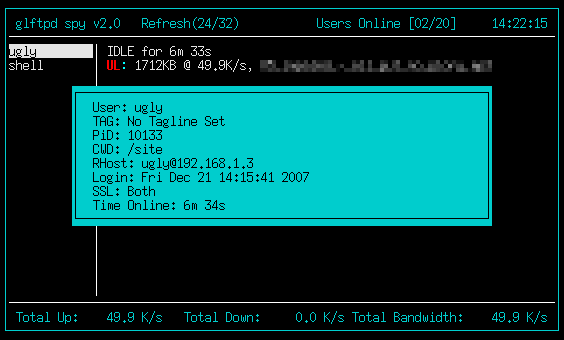
gl_spy

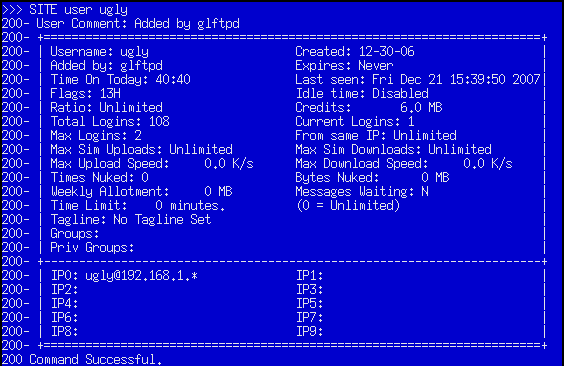
User management

== Support ==
Support for glFTPd is available on IRC on EFnet in both #glftpd and #glhelp
