= TenDRA Compiler =

C/C++ compiler for POSIX-compatible operating systems

TenDRA
- Stable release: 4.1.2
- Written in: C
- Operating system: POSIX
- Type: Compiler
- License: BSD license
- Website: www.tendra.org

The TenDRA Compiler is a C/C++ compiler for POSIX-compatible operating systems available under the terms of the BSD license.

It was originally developed by the Defence Evaluation and Research Agency (DERA) in the United Kingdom. In the beginning of 2002 TenDRA was actively developed again by Jeroen Ruigrok van der Werven and offered as a BSD-licensed open source project through the website tendra.org. In the third quarter of 2002 the one-man effort was expanded to a small team.

The TDF technology behind TenDRA has an academic history dating back to work on algebraic code validation in the 1970s.

In August 2003 TenDRA split into two projects, TenDRA.org and Ten15.org. Both projects seemed to have disappeared from the web around 2006–2007, but actually they are still active.

The goals of TenDRA.org are:

- to continuously produce correct code,
- to ensure code correctness through various means, and
- to continuously improve the performance of the compiler and resulting code, unless it would jeopardize the points above.

The goals of Ten15.org added:

- to be a friendly competitor to GCC in order to get a best-of-breed compiler.

Features of both compilers include good error reporting with respect to standards compliance and a smaller code size than the same programs compiled on gcc. C++ support never got as developed as C support, and there was no STL supporting release. TenDRA uses the Architecture Neutral Distribution Format (ANDF), a specification created by the Open Group, as its intermediate language.

At a point, most of the Alpha OSF/1 kernel could be built with TenDRA C and afterwards there was also a similar effort to port the FreeBSD kernel.

== Documentation ==
TenDRA.org has a comprehensive set of documentation available online at http://www.tendra.org/docs

Manual pages for references to programs and file formats are available at http://www.tendra.org/man

== See also ==
- TenDRA Distribution Format
