= Edutel =

Edutel B.V.
- Company type: Besloten Vennootschap
- Industry: Telecommunications
- Founded: 1998
- Headquarters: Eindhoven, Netherlands
- Area served: Netherlands
- Products: Broadband Internet; Telephony; IPTV
- Website: edutel.nl

Edutel B.V. is a Dutch telephone company, Internet service provider and IPTV supplier.

Edutel is a FTTH and FTTB service company. Its main activity is providing FTTH and FTTB multiplay services for private and business use such as telephony, internet and radio/television services. They have a direct connection to the AMS-IX and the SS7 network.

Since 2005 they also handle all telephone and Internet traffic for one of the first Dutch FTTH networks Ons Net Nuenen.

They currently provide these services for multiple FTTH projects, such as OnsBrabantNet, Ons Net Eindhoven, and as previously mentioned Ons Net Nuenen. Edutel provides also FTTH services outside the province of Brabant in FTTH networks from Reggefiber.
