= TenDRA Distribution Format =

The abstract machine TDF (originally the Ten15 Distribution Format, but more recently redefined as the TenDRA Distribution Format) evolved at the Royal Signals and Radar Establishment in the UK as a successor to Ten15. Its design allowed support for the C programming language. TDF is the basis for the Architecture Neutral Distribution Format.
