= Hydra (operating system) =

- Developer: Carnegie Mellon University
- Written in: BLISS
- OS family: Capability-based
- Working state: Discontinued
- Initial release: 1971; 54 years ago
- Final release: Final / 1975; 50 years ago
- Marketing target: Research
- Available in: English
- Update method: Compile from source code
- Kernel type: Microkernel
- Default user interface: Command-line interface

Hydra (stylized as HYDRA) is an early, discontinued, capability-based, object-oriented microkernel designed to support a wide range of possible operating systems to run on it. Hydra was created as part of the C.mmp project at Carnegie Mellon University in 1971.

The name is based on the ancient Greek mythological creature the hydra.

Hydra was designed to be modular and secure, and intended to be flexible enough for easy experimentation. The system was implemented in the programming language BLISS.
