= File eXchange Protocol =

Method of data transfer

File eXchange Protocol (FXP or FXSP) is a method of data transfer which uses FTP to transfer data from one remote server to another (inter-server) without routing this data through the client's connection. Conventional FTP involves a single server and a single client; all data transmission is done between these two. In the FXP session, a client maintains a standard FTP connection to two servers, and can direct either server to connect to the other to initiate a data transfer. The advantage of using FXP over FTP is evident when a high-bandwidth server demands resources from another high-bandwidth server, but only a low-bandwidth client, such as a network administrator working away from location, has the authority to access the resources on both servers.

== Risk ==
Enabling FXP(.RVL) support can make a server vulnerable to an exploit known as FTP bounce. As a result of this, FTP server software often has FXP disabled by default. Some sites restrict IP addresses to trusted sites to limit this risk.

== FXP over SSL ==
Some FTP Servers such as glFTPd, cuftpd, RaidenFTPD, drftpd, and wzdftpd support negotiation of a secure data channel between two servers using either of the FTP protocol extension commands; CPSV or SSCN. This normally works by the client issuing CPSV in lieu of the PASV command—or by sending SSCN prior to PASV transfers—which instructs the server to create either a SSL or TLS connection. However, both methods—CPSV and SSCN—may be susceptible to man-in-the-middle attacks, if the two FTP servers do not verify each other's SSL certificates. SSCN was first introduced by RaidenFTPD and SmartFTP in 2003 and has been widely adopted.

== Technical ==
Although FXP is often considered a distinct protocol, it is in fact merely an extension of the FTP protocol and is specified in RFC 959:

         User-PI - Server A  (Dest)              User-PI - Server B  (Source)
         ------------------                      ------------------
        
         C->A : Connect                          C->B : Connect
         C->A : PASV
         A->C : 227 Entering Passive Mode. A1,A2,A3,A4,a1,a2
                                                 C->B : PORT A1,A2,A3,A4,a1,a2
                                                 B->C : 200 Okay
         C->A : STOR                             C->B : RETR

                    B->A : Connect to HOST-A, PORT-a

== See also ==
- File Transfer Protocol (FTP)
- Trivial File Transfer Protocol (TFTP)
- SSH file transfer protocol (sftp), a protocol running over SSH
- FTPS (FTPS), FTP run over SSL
- Simple File Transfer Protocol (SFTP), the historical protocol RFC 913
