= IAPX =

Intel processor architecture

In marketing, iAPX (Intel Advanced Performance Architecture) was a short lived designation used for several Intel microprocessors, including some 8086 family processors.

The iAPX prefix originally belonged to the Intel iAPX 432 architecture, alias Intel 8800. However, as this radical design failed in the marketplace, Intel also tried it on its more conventional 8086-family of processors, mainly used as a kind of system prefix but also to denote individual processors in the family. The 8086 based line was therefore called the iAPX 86 series for a few years during the early 1980s. This was abandoned rather soon, however. The industry around the 8088- and 80286-based de facto standard of IBM PC and IBM AT designs also seldom used that naming scheme. As a result, the iAPX prefix is now, again, more closely associated with the (non-x86) iAPX 432 architecture (which, although a commercial failure, is often seen as historically important).

== List of x86-related iAPX chips and multi-chip system configurations ==
- iAPX 86 and iAPX 86/10 refer to the 8086
- iAPX 86/11 refers to a combination of 8086 and 8089 (IOP)
- iAPX 86/20 refers to a combination of 8086 and 8087 (NPX)
- iAPX 86/21 refers to a combination of 8086, 8087 and 8089
- iAPX 86/30 refers to a combination of 8086 and 80130 (OSP)
- iAPX 88 and iAPX 88/10 refers to the 8088
- iAPX 88/11 refers to a combination of 8088 and 8089
- iAPX 88/20 refers to a combination of 8088 and 8087
- iAPX 88/21 refers to a combination of 8088, 8087 and 8089
- iAPX 88/30 refers to a combination of 8088 and 80130
- iAPX 186 and iAPX 186/10 refer to the 80186
- iAPX 186/11 refers to a combination of 80186 and 8089
- iAPX 186/20 refers to a combination of 80186 and 8087
- iAPX 186/21 refers to a combination of 80186, 8087 and 8089
- iAPX 186/30 refers to a combination of 80186 and 80130
- iAPX 186/40 refers to a combination of 80186, 8087 and 80130
- iAPX 188 and iAPX 188/10 refer to the 80188
- iAPX 188/20 refers to a combination of 80188 and 8087
- iAPX 188/21 refers to a combination of 80188, 8087 and 8089
- iAPX 188/30 refers to a combination of 80188 and 80130
- iAPX 286 and iAPX 286/10 refer to the 80286
- iAPX 286/20 refers to a combination of 80286 and 80287
- iAPX 386 refers to the 80386

== List of non-x86 iAPX chips ==
- Intel iAPX 432
- Intel MCS (Intel Micro Computer Set)
