= Millennium Cohort Study =

Millennium Cohort Study may refer to:

- Millennium Cohort Study (United Kingdom)
- Millennium Cohort Study (United States)

== See also ==
- Millennium Cohort Family Study, an offshoot of the United States Millennium Cohort Study
