= MCS =

MCS may refer to:

== Businesses and organizations ==
- MCS (fashion brand), Italy
- Marcus Corporation, United States (by NYSE symbol)
- Marine Conservation Society, United Kingdom
- Methodist Church in Singapore
- Muslim Council of Scotland

== Education ==
=== Qualifications ===
- Master of Christian Studies
- Master of Computer Science

=== Schools ===
==== Canada ====
- Master's College and Seminary, Peterborough
- Department of Mathematical and Computational Sciences (University of Toronto)

==== Philippines ====
- Malate Catholic School, Manila
- Mater Carmeli School, Quezon City

==== Pakistan ====
- Military College of Signals, Rawalpindi
- Murree Christian School, Jhika Gali

==== United Kingdom ====
- Magdalen College School, Oxford
- Magdalen College School, Brackley
- Michaela Community School, London

==== United States ====
- Manhattan Country School, New York
- McMinn County Schools, Tennessee
- Mellon College of Science, Carnegie Mellon University, Pennsylvania
- Montrose Christian School, Rockville, Maryland
- Muncie Community Schools, Indiana
- Murfreesboro City Schools, Tennessee

==== Elsewhere ====
- Maryknoll Convent School, Hong Kong
- Malahide Community School, Dublin, Ireland

== Science and technology ==
=== Astronomy ===
- Mars Climate Sounder, onboard the Mars Reconnaissance Orbiter
- Massive Cluster Survey

=== Biology and medicine ===
- Membrane contact site, in cells
- Millennium Cohort Study (disambiguation)
- Minimally conscious state, a disorder
- Multiple chemical sensitivity, a controversial medical diagnosis
- Multiple cloning site, in a plasmid

=== Computing ===
- Master of Computer Science
- Multiple Console Support, in OS/360 and successors
- Multi categories security, in Security-Enhanced Linux
- Multinational Character Set, used in VT220 terminals
- Music Construction Set, a music composition notation program
- MCS algorithm (Multilevel Coordinate Search), a derivative-free optimization algorithm
- Micro Computer Set (disambiguation), various Intel microprocessor architectures

=== Telecommunications ===
- Matrix cable system, connecting Indonesia and Singapore
- Modulation and coding scheme

=== Other uses in science and technology ===
- Megawatt Charging System, electric vehicle charging connector
- Mercalli-Cancani-Sieberg scale, a scale of earthquake intensity, successor to the Mercalli intensity scale
- Mesoscale convective system, a complex of thunderstorms

== Other uses ==
- Main Character Syndrome, or narcissism
- Medieval combat sport, a modern combat sport
- Motion City Soundtrack, a pop punk / rock band from Minneapolis, Minnesota
- Milwaukee County Stadium, Former stadium in Milwaukee, Wisconsin
- A US Navy hull classification symbol: Mine countermeasures support ship (MCS)
- Management control system
- Michigan Central Station, a former rail station depot in Detroit, Michigan, US
