= Glenford Myers =

American computer scientist, entrepreneur and author

Glenford J. Myers
- Born: December 12, 1946; Saugerties, New York, United States
- Education: Clarkson University; Syracuse University; Polytechnic Inst, NYU
- Known for: Software testing Intel microprocessors Communications interception Founder and CEO, RadiSys; Founder and CEO, IP Fabrics

Glenford Myers (born December 12, 1946) is an American computer scientist, entrepreneur, and author. He founded two successful high-tech companies (RadiSys and IP Fabrics), authored eight textbooks in the computer sciences, and made important contributions in microprocessor architecture. He holds a number of patents, including the original patent on "register scoreboarding" in microprocessor chips. He has a BS in electrical engineering from Clarkson University, an MS in computer science from Syracuse University, and a PhD in computer science from the Polytechnic Institute of New York University.

== Career ==
=== IBM ===
Myers joined IBM in 1968 in its Poughkeepsie, New York lab. After spending a few years working on developments associated with the System/360 mainframes, he moved to the prestigious IBM Systems Research Institute in New York City. There he headed up a small team of people developing an advanced computer system named "SWARD" (Software Oriented Architecture) incorporating such concepts as tagged storage, capability-based addressing, organization by objects, and a single-level store. The machine was built and successfully operated in 1980.

During this period, Myers also authored his first four books, including The Art of Software Testing, a book that became a classic and a best-seller in the computer science field, staying in print for 26 years before it was replaced by a second edition in 2004. Myers also served as a lecturer in computer science at the Polytechnic Institute of New York University, where he taught graduate-level courses in computer science. Years later, he was the 1988 recipient of the J.-D. Warnier Prize for his contributions to the field of software engineering.

=== Intel ===
In early 1981 Myers was hired from IBM by the then-small company called Intel to build a new organization to head off the leadership Motorola seemed to be gaining with its "clean" 68000 chip rather than Intel's more-difficult-to-program 8086. This project, code named the "P4", became less critical to Intel when IBM, later that year, announced the IBM PC using a variant of the Intel 8086. To coordinate Intel's strategy, Myers was appointed Manager of Microprocessor Product-Line Architecture to manage a number of efforts, including the movement of the 8086 and successors to a 32-bit architecture called the Intel 80386 (386), in which Myers played a key role in making many of the early decisions, the Intel iAPX 432, a very unconventional design from Intel's team in Oregon, the Intel i860, a type of RISC vector-processing machine, and the RISC-oriented 80960 (i960). Myers also chaired Intel's Microprocessor Strategic Business Segment, part of Intel's strategic long-range planning process.

In 1983, Myers moved to Oregon to take personal charge of the design of the i960 microprocessor. The i960 was the first microprocessor chip that could execute multiple instructions in parallel. In 1986, Myers co-authored an invited paper with Intel senior vice presidents Albert Yu and Dave House that outlined Intel's microprocessor thinking for the next 10 years. In 1990, Myers, for his work on the i960 microprocessor, was one of three finalists for Discover Magazine's Awards for Technological Innovation

=== RadiSys ===
In 1987, Myers and key i960 chip manager Dave Budde left Intel and founded RadiSys Corporation. Myers took the roles of CEO and Chairman, positions he held until 2002. A number of other Intel employees quickly joined the new venture, all of whom worked for no salary and instead invested money in the startup (in trade for stock). Because 1987 turned out to be one of the worst periods in history for raising venture capital, the early employees moonlighted to keep RadiSys afloat; for instance, Myers returned to Intel as a consultant on the design of the Intel 80486 processor chip. After operating on a shoe string for a year, RadiSys raised $6.5 million from three unconventional sources: Tektronix, State Farm Insurance, and the State of Oregon. By 1992, RadiSys had sales of over $10 million, 61 employees, and was 90th on the Inc. 500 of fastest-growing private companies. In 1995, RadiSys became a publicly traded company (symbol RSYS) when it held an initial public offering (IPO). The company then grew rapidly, in part because of a series of acquisitions, including a division of Intel, two small operations from IBM, and several other private companies.

In 2000, under Myers' leadership, RadiSys had revenues of $341 million, net income of $33 million, a market cap in excess of $1 billion, and 1153 employees. The company became increasingly focused on the telecommunications market, with Nokia being its largest customer and representing over 20% of its revenue. In 2002, after a series of disagreements with the board of directors, Myers left and formed IP Fabrics, and nine other key RadiSys managers and engineers quickly joined him there.

=== IP Fabrics ===
Myers, along with nine others who left RadiSys, founded IP Fabrics in 2002 and became its CEO. He raised $8 million in venture capital from Intel Capital, Ignition Partners, Northwest Venture Associates, and Frazier Technology Partners. Initially, IP Fabrics' business was providing a virtualization environment for highly parallel network processors, with the starting point being Intel's IXP network processors. However, when Intel decided to exit this business, IP Fabrics quickly changed its direction to that of providing communications interception systems using the previously developed network-processor software and hardware within. For instance, within the U.S., IP Fabrics provides systems for intercepting voice over IP (VoIP) and Internet communications to law-enforcement agencies and telecommunications carriers for adherence to the Communications Assistance for Law Enforcement Act (CALEA). It also provides products for the interception of instant messaging services, social networking services, email, webmail, and other types of traffic.

Myers also serves as chairman of the Alliance for Telecommunications Industry Solutions (ATIS) Lawfully Authorized Electronic Surveillance subcommittee, an organization of law-enforcement and other government agencies and telecommunications carriers and equipment suppliers that develops standards for wiretapping.

== Publications ==
Myers has published a number of technical papers and has authored eight texts. A selection of these follows:

- Reliable Software Through Composite Design. New York: Petrocelli/Charter, 1975.
- Software Reliability: Principles and Practices. New York: Wiley, 1976.
- Composite/Structured Design. New York: Van Nostrand Reinhold, 1978.
- Advances in Computer Architecture. New York: Wiley, 1978.
- "A Controlled Experiment in Program Testing and Code Walkthroughs/Inspections," Communications of the ACM, Vol. 21, No. 9, September 1978.
- The Art of Software Testing. New York: Wiley, 1979.
- "The Advantages of Higher-Level Computer Architectures," Proceedings of the 1979 National Aerospace and Electronics Conference, 1979.
- Digital System Design with LSI Bit-Slice Logic. New York: Wiley, 1980.
- "SWARD – A Software-Oriented Architecture," Proceedings of the International Workshop on High-Level Language Computer Architecture, University of Maryland, 1980.
- A Hardware Implementation of Capability-Based Addressing, with Brian Buckingham, Operating Systems Review, Vol. 14, No. 4, 1980.
- "The Use of Software Simulators in the Testing and Debugging of Microprogram Logic," IEEE Transactions on Computers, Vol. C-30, No. 7, July 1981.
- Advances in Computer Architecture, Second Edition. New York: Wiley, 1982.
- "Microprocessor Technology Trends," with Albert Yu and David House, Proceedings of the IEEE, Vol. 74, No. 12, December 1986.
- The 80960 Microprocessor Architecture. with David Budde. New York: Wiley, 1988.
- The Art of Software Testing, Second Edition. with Tom Badgett and Todd M. Thomas, New York: Wiley, 2004.
- "A Security Framework for the Intel IXP2xxx NPUs," 2005 Network Systems Design Conference Proceedings, October 2005.
- "Network Surveillance Beyond Lawful Interception," U.S. Dept. of Defense Cyber Crime Conference 2007 Proceedings, January 2007.
- "Robust Lawful Intercept of VoIP, Data, and Email at 10Gb and Above," ISS World Conference Proceedings, October 2008.
- "Deep Application Protocol Inspection at Wire Speed," ISS World Conference Proceedings, October 2009.
- "The Art of Intercepting Instant-Messaging and Chat-Room Traffic," ISS World Conference Proceedings, June 2010.
- "Intercepting Communications Among Users of Social-Networking Services and Virtual Worlds," ISS World Conference Proceedings, December 2010.
- The Art of Software Testing, Third Edition. with Tom Badgett and Corey Sandler, New York: Wiley, 2012.
