= Micro Computer Set =

(Intel) Micro Computer Set or (Intel) MCS may refer to:

- Intel MCS-4, Intel 4004 processor architecture and chip family
- Intel MCS-8, Intel 8008 processor architecture and chip family
- Intel MCS-40, Intel 4040 processor architecture and chip family
- Intel MCS-80, Intel 8080 processor architecture and chip family
- Intel MCS-85, Intel 8085 processor architecture and chip family
- Intel MCS-86, Intel 8086 processor architecture and chip family
- Intel MCS-88, Intel 8088 processor architecture and chip family
- Intel MCS-48, Intel 8048 processor architecture and chip family
- Intel MCS-51, Intel 8051 processor architecture and chip family
- Intel MCS-151, Intel 80151 processor architecture and chip family
- Intel MCS-251, Intel 80251 processor architecture and chip family
- Intel MCS-96, Intel 8096 processor architecture and chip family
- Intel MCS-196, Intel 80196 processor architecture and chip family
- Intel MCS-296, Intel 80296 processor architecture and chip family

== See also ==
- MCS (disambiguation)
- Intel iAPX
