= Fred Pollack =

Fred Pollack is a retired microprocessor electronics engineer who worked on several Intel chips. He was the lead engineer of the Intel iAPX 432, the lead architect of the Intel i960, and the lead architect of the Pentium Pro.

He specialized in superscalarity. Pollack's Rule was named for Pollack and states that microprocessor "performance increase due to microarchitecture advances is roughly proportional to [the] square root of [the] increase in complexity." Pollack worked for Intel and left in 2001.
