= IMAX 432 =

Former operating system

iMAX 432
- Developer: Intel
- Written in: Ada
- Working state: Discontinued
- Initial release: 1982; 44 years ago
- Supported platforms: Intel iAPX 432

iMAX 432 (Intel Multifunction Applications eXecutive for the Intel 432 Micromainframe) was an operating system developed by Intel for digital electronic computers based on the 1980s Intel iAPX 432 32-bit microprocessor. The term micromainframe was an Intel marketing designation describing the iAPX 432 processor's capabilities as being comparable to a mainframe. The iAPX 432 processor and the iMAX 432 operating system were incompatible with the x86 architecture commonly found in personal computers. iMAX 432 was implemented in a subset of the original (1980) version of the Ada, extended with runtime type checking and dynamic package creation.

As of 1982 in iMAX version 2, iMAX was aimed at programmers rather than application users, and it did not provide a command line or other human interface. iMAX provided a runtime environment for the Ada programming language and other high-level languages, as well as an incomplete Ada compiler which was to be extended to cover the full Ada programming language in a later iMAX version after Version 2.

There were at least two versions of iMAX as of 1982, Version 1 and Version 2. Version 1 was undergoing internal Intel testing as of 1981 and was scheduled to be released in 1982. Version 2 was modular and the programmer could choose what parts of the iMAX operating system to load; there were two standard configurations of iMAX version 2 named "Full" and "Minimal", with the minimal configuration being similar to Version 1 of iMAX. As of 1982, a Version 3 of iMAX was planned for release, which was to add support for virtual memory.

== See also ==
- History of operating systems

== Bibliography ==
- Kahn, Kevin C.; Corwin, William M.; Dennis, T. Don; d'Hooge, Herman; Hubka, David E.; Hutchins, Linda A.; Montague, John T.; Pollack, Fred J. (December 1981). "iMAX: A multiprocessor operating system for an object-based computer" (PDF). ACM SIGOPS Operating Systems Review. 15 (5): 127–136. doi:10.1145/800216.806601. S2CID 9245960.
- Zeigler, Stephen F; Weicker, Reinhold P. (May–June 1983). "Ada Language statistics for the iMAX 432 operating system". ACM SIGAda Ada Letters. II (6). Association for Computing Machinery: 63–67. doi:10.1145/989813.989818. S2CID 24107228.
