= Intel i960 =

RISC-based microprocessor design

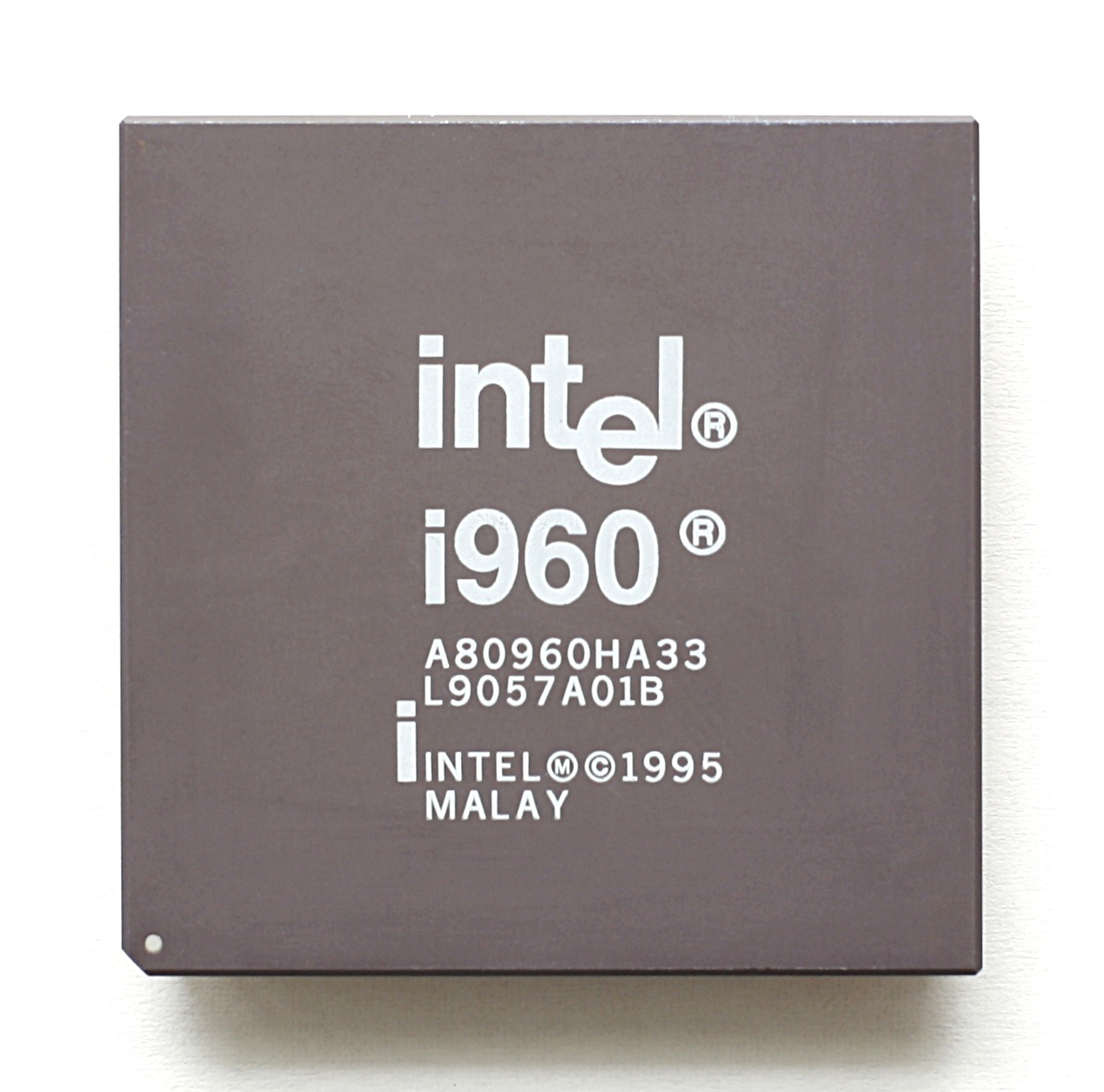
- Intel i960HA microprocessor

General information
- Launched: April 6, 1988
- Discontinued: 2007
- Common manufacturer: Intel

Performance
- Max. CPU clock rate: 10 MHz to 100 MHz
- Data width: 32 bits (33 bits in Extended architecture)

Physical specifications
- Cores: 1

Intel's i960 (or 80960) is a RISC-based microprocessor design that became popular during the early 1990s as an embedded microcontroller. It became a best-selling CPU in that segment, along with the competing AMD 29000. In spite of its success, Intel stopped marketing the i960 in the late 1990s, as a result of a settlement with DEC whereby Intel received the rights to produce the StrongARM CPU. The processor continues to be used for a few military applications.

== Origin ==
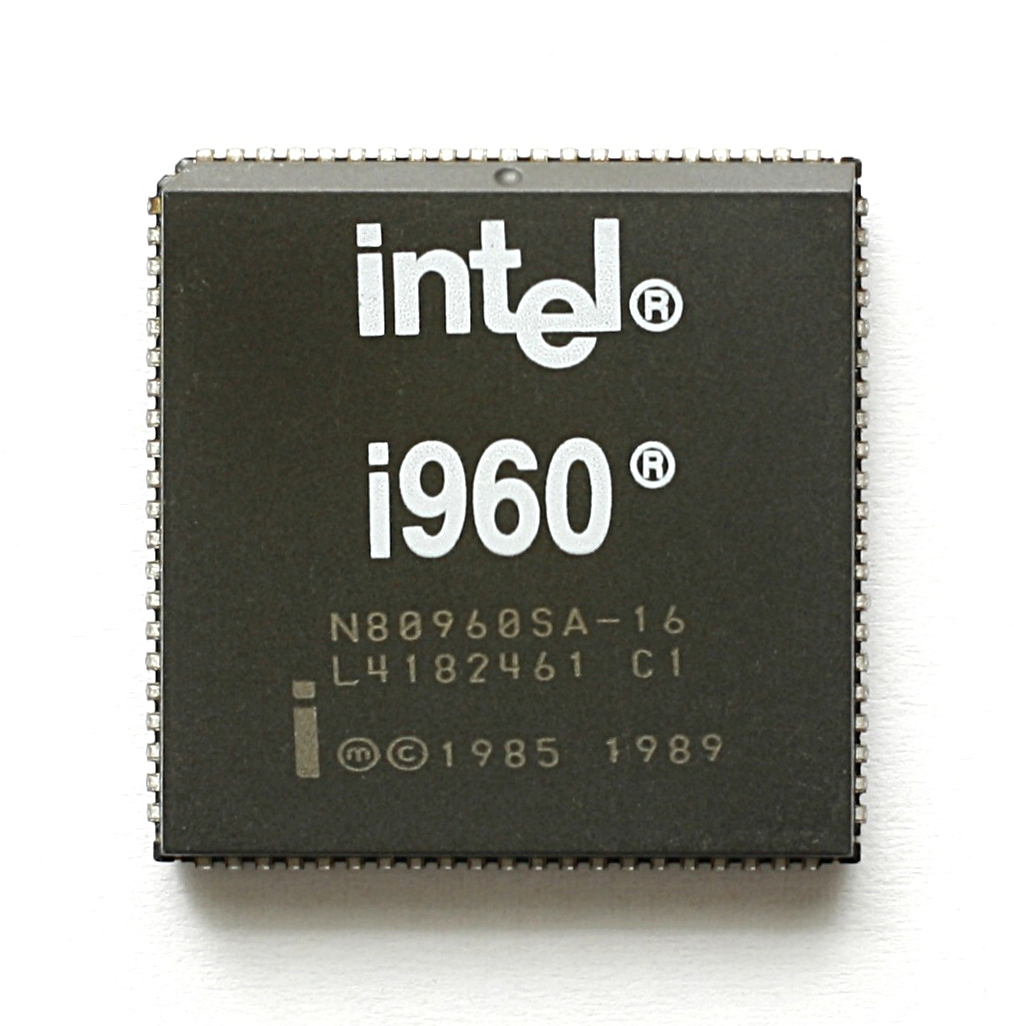
Intel N80960SA (PLCC Package)

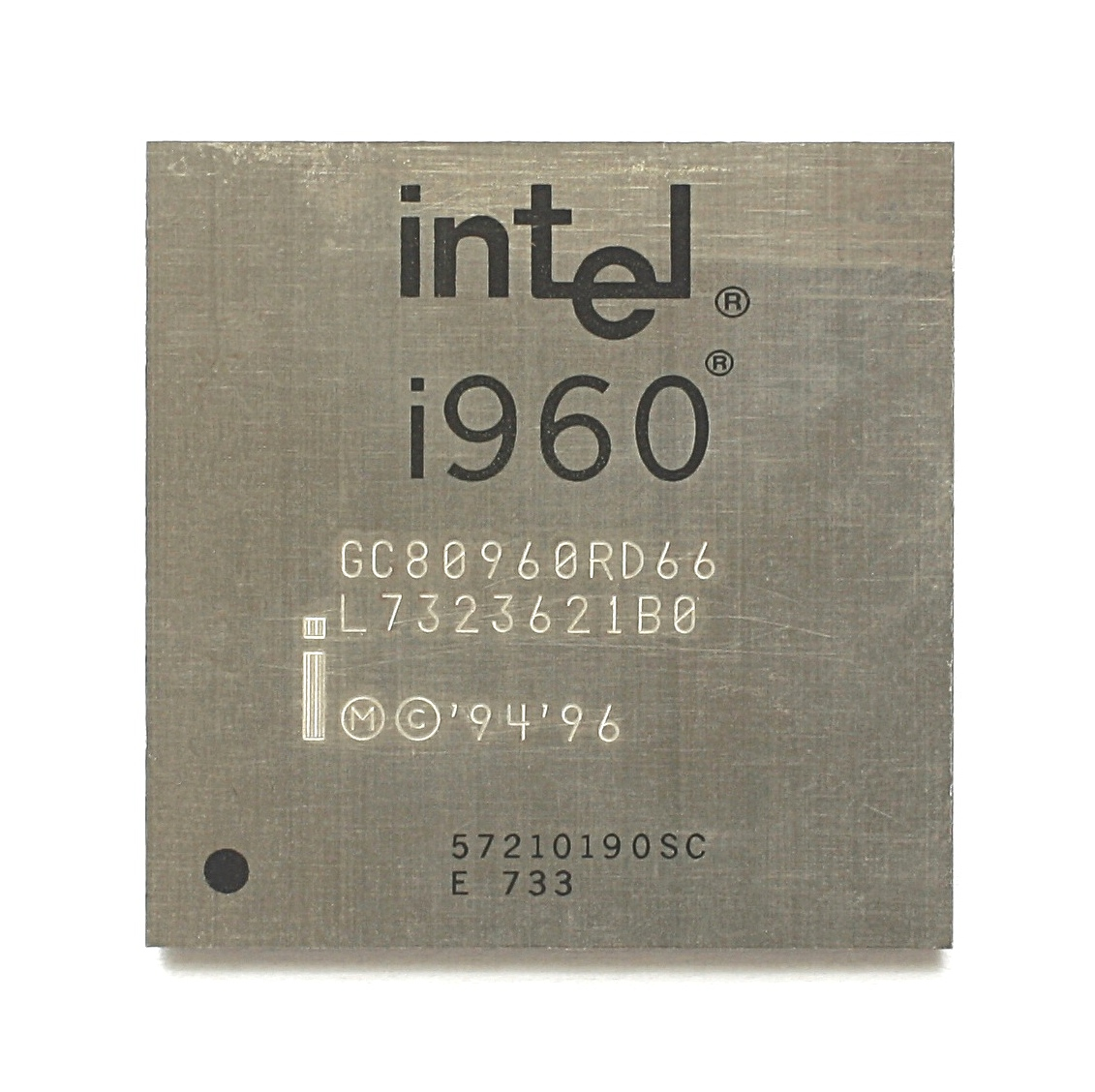
Intel GC80960RD66 (BGA Package)

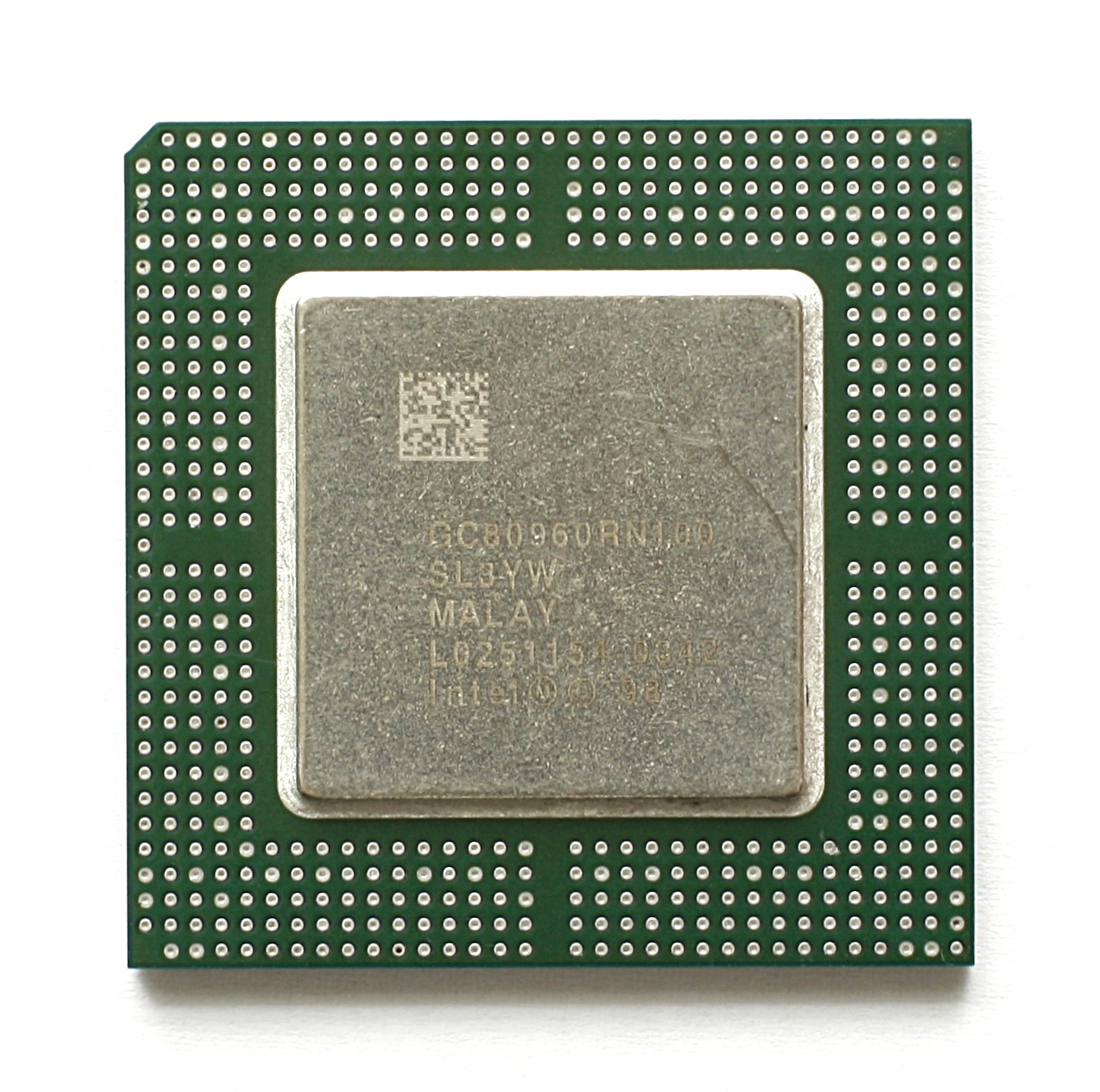
Intel GC80960RN, sSpec: SL3YW, BGA Package

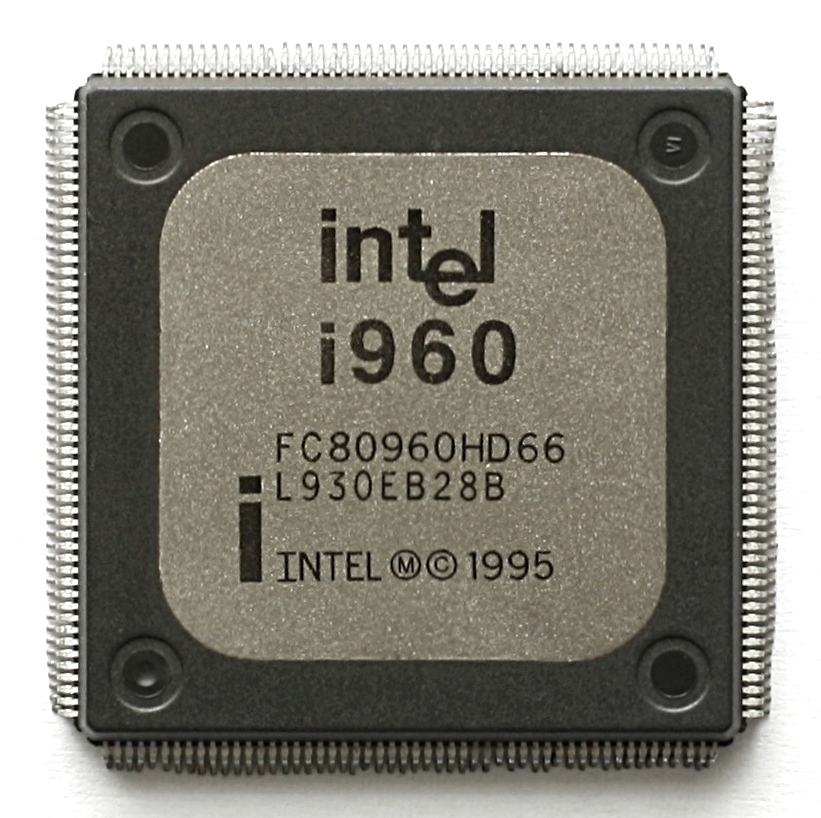
Intel FC80960HD66 (PQFP Package)

The i960 design was begun in response to the failure of Intel's iAPX 432 design of the early 1980s. The iAPX 432 was intended to directly support high-level languages that supported tagged, protected, garbage-collected memory—such as Ada and Lisp—in hardware. Because of its instruction-set complexity, its multi-chip implementation, and design flaws, the iAPX 432 was very slow in comparison to other processors of its time.

In 1984, Intel and Siemens started a joint project, ultimately called BiiN, to create a high-end, fault-tolerant, object-oriented computer system programmed entirely in Ada. Many of the original i432 team members joined this project, although a new lead architect, Glenford Myers, was brought in from IBM. The intended market for the BiiN systems was high-reliability-computer users such as banks, industrial systems, and nuclear power plants.

Intel's major contribution to the BiiN system was a new processor design, influenced by the protected-memory concepts from the i432. The new design was to include a number of features to improve performance and avoid problems that had led to the i432's downfall. The first 960 processors entered the final stages of design, known as taping-out, in October 1985 and were sent to manufacturing that month, with the first working chips arriving in late 1985 and early 1986.

The BiiN effort eventually failed, due to market forces, and the 960 was left without a use. Myers attempted to save the design by extracting several subsets of the full capability architecture created for the BiiN system. He tried to convince Intel management to market the i960 (then still known as the "P7") as a general-purpose processor, both in place of the Intel 80286 and i386 (which taped-out the same month as the first i960), as well as the emerging RISC market for Unix systems, including a pitch to Steve Jobs for use in the NeXT system. Myers was unsuccessful at convincing Intel management to support the i960 as a general-purpose or Unix processor, but the chip found a ready market in early high-performance 32-bit embedded systems.

The lead architect of i960 was superscalarity specialist Fred Pollack who was also the lead engineer of the Intel iAPX 432 and the lead architect of the i686 chip, the Pentium Pro.

== Architecture ==
The i960 family features four distinct architectures, designed for upward binary compatibility:

- Core architecture is a RISC-like core
- Numerics architecture adds floating point
- Protected architecture adds paged memory management, supervisor/user protection, string instructions, process scheduling, interprocess communication for the OS, and symmetric multiprocessing
- Extended architecture adds object protection and interprocess communication for applications

In the initial release, the 80960KA supported the Core architecture, the 80960KB supported the Numerics architecture, the 80960MC supported the Protected architecture, and the 80960XA supported the Extended architecture.

To avoid the performance issues that plagued the i432, the central i960 instruction-set architecture was a RISC design. In the Extended architecture, the memory subsystem was 33-bits wide—to accommodate a 32-bit word and a "tag" bit to implement memory protection in hardware. In many ways, the i960 followed the original Berkeley RISC design, notably in its use of register windows, an implementation-specific number of caches for the per-subroutine registers that allowed for fast subroutine calls. The competing Stanford University design, MIPS, did not use this system, instead relying on the compiler to generate optimal subroutine call and return code. In common with most 32-bit designs, the i960 has a flat 32-bit memory space, with no memory segmentation, except for the Extended architecture, which could support up to 2^{26} "objects", each up to 2^{32} bytes in size. The i960 architecture also anticipated a superscalar implementation, with instructions being simultaneously dispatched to more than one unit within the processor.

== i960 variants ==
=== 80960MC ===
The i960MC included all of the features of the original BiiN system; but these were simply not mentioned in the specifications, leading some to wonder why the i960MC was so large and had so many pins - 53 out of 132 - labeled "no connect". Later iterations of the i960, like the 80960Jx series, have a more typical number of "do no connect" and use more power and ground pins and have additional I/O pins instead. However, these "no connect" pins are actually not connected internally and unrelated to the BiiN feature set - the silicon die inside does not have bond pads for them.

The 80960MC contains an on-chip memory management unit and supports fault tolerant systems in conjunction with Intel's M82965 Bus Extension Unit as well. Both chips meet the MIL-STD-883C standard. Both chips became available in the first quarter of 1989 with the price of US$2400 and US$1700 respectively. Extended temperature samples became available in August 1988 as well.

It contains 32 32-bit registers, a 512 byte instruction cache, a stack frame cache, a high speed 32-bit multiplexed burst bus, and an interrupt controller. It also has 256 interrupt vectors and 32 levels of interrupt priority.

=== 80960XA ===
The 80960XA is a military member of the i960 family, implementing the Extended architecture, a superset of the military 80960MC. It supports object-oriented programming with a 33rd tag bit in hardware, a Capability. It supports the Joint Industrial Avionics Working Group (JIAWG) 32-bit ISA standard.

=== 80960KA, 80960KB ===
A version of the RISC core without memory management or an FPU became the i960KA, and the RISC core with an FPU became the i960KB. The versions were, however, identical internally—only the labeling was different. This meant the CPUs were much larger than necessary for the "actually supported" feature sets, and as a result, more expensive to manufacture than they needed to be.

These processors contain more than 350,000 transistors. These processors can perform around 7.5 VAX MIPS. The 80960KB version is compatible with IEEE 754 standard and can perform up to 4 MWIPS. Both processors are available in 16 and 20 MHz using CHMOS-III technology. Both processors are packaged in 132-PGA. The 80960KA version is available for US$230 and the 80960KB version is available for US$390 in quantities of 100 respectively.

The i960KA became successful as a low-cost 32-bit processor for the laser-printer market, as well as for early graphics terminals and other embedded applications. Its success paid for future generations, which were without the complex memory sub-system.

=== 80960CA, 80960CF ===
The i960CA was announced in July 1989. It featured a newly designed superscalar RISC core and added an unusual addressable on-chip cache, but lacked an FPU and MMU, as it was intended for high-performance embedded applications. The i960CA is widely considered to have been the first single-chip superscalar RISC implementation. The C-series included only one ALU, but could dispatch and execute an arithmetic instruction, a memory reference, and a branch instruction at the same time, and sustain two instructions per cycle under certain circumstances. The first versions released ran at 33 MHz, and Intel promoted the chip as capable of 66 MIPS. The i960CA microarchitecture was designed in 1987–1988 and formally announced on September 12, 1989.

Later, in May 1992, came the i960CF, which included a larger instruction cache (4 KB instead of 1 KB) and added 1 KB of data cache, but was still without an FPU or MMU.

=== 80960MX ===
The 80960MX is a superscalar implementation of the Extended architecture, executing up to three instructions per clock execution for sustained performance of 25 VAX MIPS. It implemented the Joint Industrial Avionics Working Group (JIAWG) 32-bit ISA standard. It was originally packaged in a 348 lead ceramic pin grid array and later supplied as a bare die. The i960 MX supports object-oriented programming. A 33rd tag bit distinguished between a 32-bit data word and a 32-bit pointer to memory. This prohibited forged pointers to protected areas of memory.

=== 80960Jx ===
The 80960Jx is a processor for embedded applications. It features a 32-bit multiplexed address/data bus, instruction and data cache, 1K on-chip RAM, interrupt controller, and two independent 32-bit timers. The 80960Jx's testability features included ONCE (on-circuit emulation) mode and boundary scan (JTAG).

=== 80960HA, 80960HD, 80960HT ===
The 80960Hx processors offered upgraded performance from the Cx variants by offering clock multiplication, larger 16K instruction cache and 4k data cache, and a GMU (Guarded Memory Unit). The HD variant had an internal 2× clock multiplication while the HT version has a 3x clock multiplication, allowing increased performance without external bus speed changes.

=== 80960VH ===
Announced in October 1998, the i960VH Embedded-PCI processor featured a 32-bit 33 MHz PCI bus and 100 MHz i960JT processor core. The core also featured 16 KB of instruction cache, 4 KB of data cache, and 1 KB of built-in RAM. Other core features included two 32-bit timers, programmable interrupt controller, I²C interface, and a two-channel DMA controller.

=== 80960Rx ===
The 80960Rx processors were labeled as I/O Processors and included an implementation of the PCI Bus (2.1 or 2.2 depending on the variant) as well as a 80960Jx core. These could be used on motherboards to implement on-board PCI device as well as on PCI expansion cards. The RM/RN/RS variants used a JT core with a 3x bus to core multiplication to achieve 100 MHz internal clock speeds, while the RD variant used a JF core with 2× multiplication to achieve 66 MHz. The RP variant had a JF core that ran at the 33 MHz bus speed.

== Variant specifications ==
5 V Parts
Model Number	Core Frequency	Bus Frequency	Multiplier	iCache	dCache	Voltage	Socket
80960MC	20,25 MHz	20,25 MHz	1.0x	0.5 KByte	none	5.0 V	PGA-132
80960SA	10,12,16,20 MHz	10,12,16,20 MHz	1.0x	0.5 KByte	none	5.0 V	80-PQFP,84-PLCC
80960SB	10,16 MHz	10,16 MHz	1.0x	0.5 KByte	none	5.0 V	80-PQFP,84-PLCC
80960KA	10,20,25 MHz	10,20,25 MHz	1.0x	0.5 KByte	none	5.0 V	132-PQFP,132-PGA
80960KB	16,20,25 MHz	16,20,25 MHz	1.0x	0.5 KByte	none	5.0 V	132-PQFP,132-PGA
80960CA	16,25,33 MHz	16,25,33 MHz	1.0x	1 KByte	none	5.0 V	168-PGA,196-PQFP
80960CF	25,33,40 MHz	25,33,40 MHz	1.0x	4 KByte	1 KByte	5.0 V	168-PGA,196-PQFP

3.3 V Parts
Model Number	Core Frequency	Bus Frequency	Multiplier	iCache	dCache	Voltage	Socket
80960JA	16,25,33 MHz	16,25,33 MHz	1.0x	2 KByte	1 KByte	3.3 V	132-PQFP,132-PGA
80960JF	25,33 MHz	25,33 MHz	1.0x	4 KByte	2 KByte	3.3 V	132-PQFP,132-PGA
80960JD	33,40,50,66 MHz	16,20,25,33 MHz	2.0x	4 KByte	2 KByte	3.3 V	132-PQFP,132-PGA
80960JS	25,33 MHz	25,33 MHz	1.0x	16 KByte	4 KByte	3.3 V	132-PQFP,132-PGA,196-MPBGA
80960JC	50,66 MHz	25,33 MHz	2.0x	16 KByte	4 KByte	3.3 V	132-PQFP,132-PGA,196-MPBGA
80960JT	75,100 MHz	25,33 MHz	3.0x	16 KByte	4 KByte	3.3 V	132-PQFP,132-PGA,196-MPBGA
80960HA	25,33,40 MHz	25,33,40 MHz	1.0x	16 KByte	8 KByte	3.3 V	168-PGA,208-PQ4
80960HD	50,66,80 MHz	25,33,40 MHz	2.0x	16 KByte	8 KByte	3.3 V	168-PGA,208-PQ4
80960HT	75 MHz	25 MHz	3.0x	16 KByte	8 KByte	3.3 V	168-PGA,208-PQ4

PCI I/O Processor Variants
Model Number	Core Frequency	Bus Frequency	Multiplier	iCache	dCache	PCI Version	Voltage	Socket
80960RP	33 MHz	33 MHz	1.0x	4 KB	2 KB	PCI 2.1	3.3 V	352-PBGA
80960RD	66 MHz	33 MHz	2.0x	4 KB	2 KB	PCI 2.1	3.3 V	352-PBGA
80960VH	100 MHz	33 MHz	3.0x	16 KB	4 KB	PCI 2.1	3.3 V	324-PBGA
80960RM/N	100 MHz	33 MHz	3.0x	16 KB	4 KB	PCI 2.1	3.3 V	540-PBGA
80960RS	100 MHz	33 MHz	3.0x	16 KB	4 KB	PCI 2.2	3.3 V	540-PBGA
80302/3	100 MHz	66 MHz	1.5x	16 KB	4 KB	PCI 2.2	3.3 V	540-PBGA

Die shots

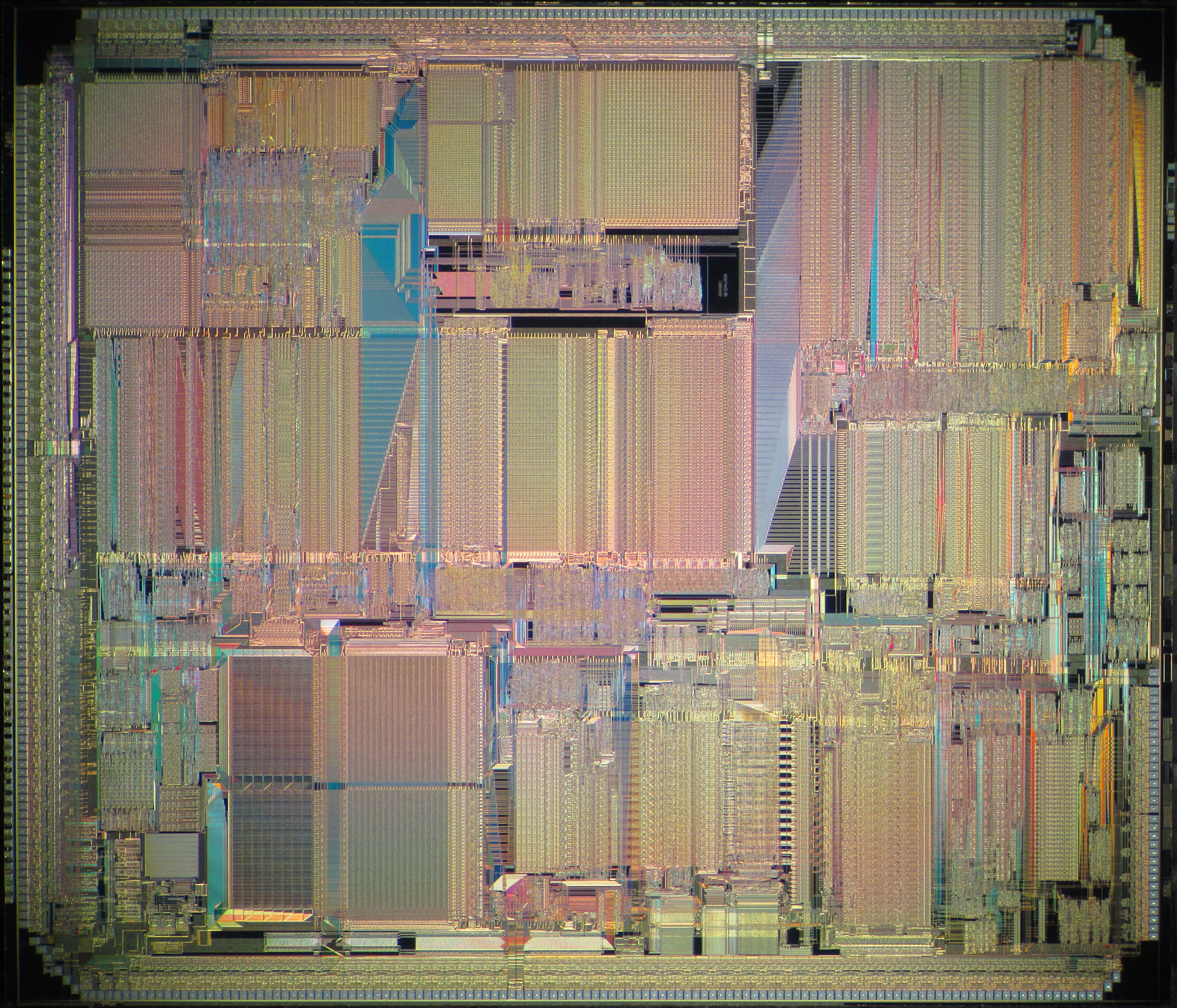
Intel 80960MX

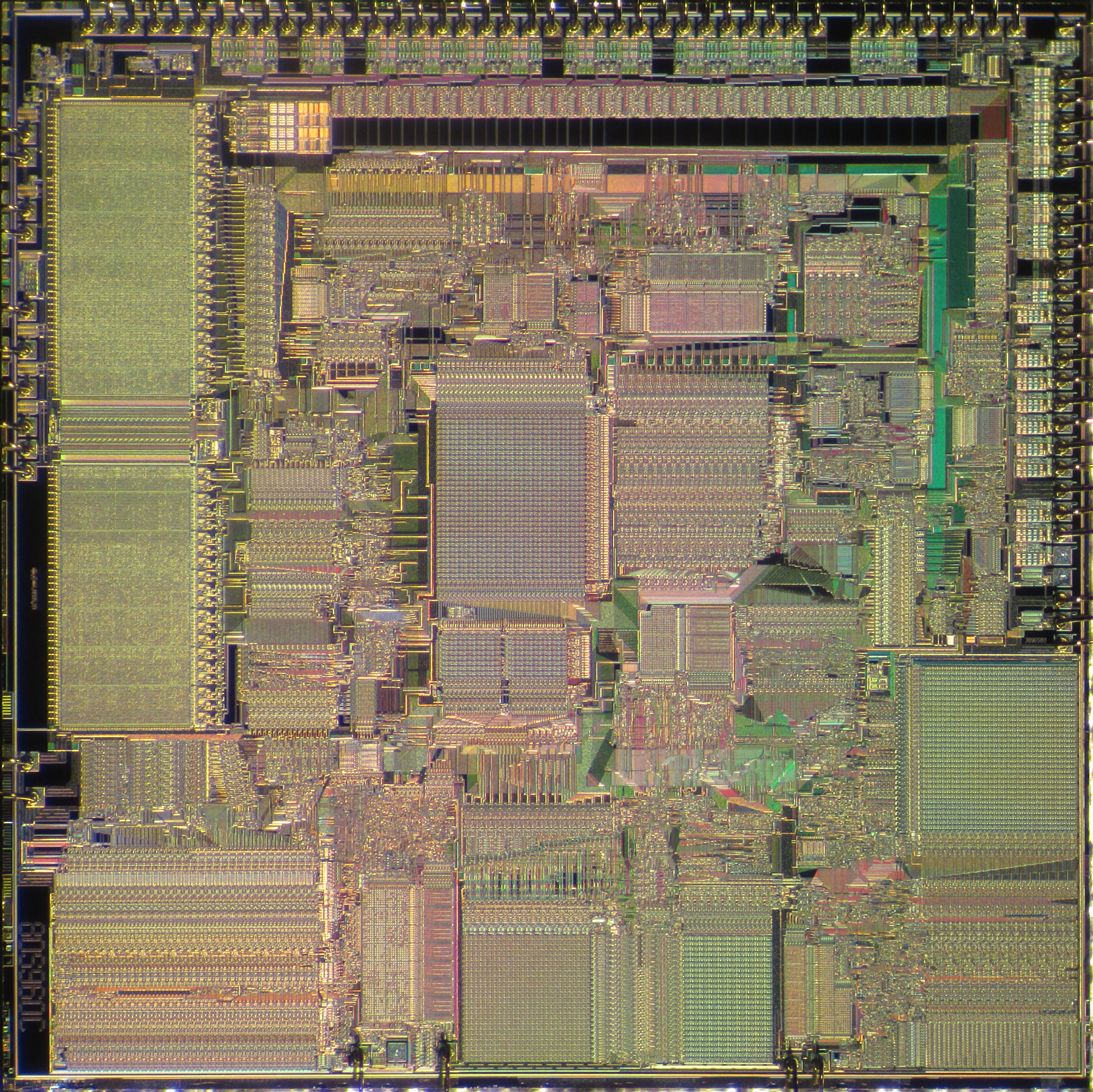
Intel 80960KA

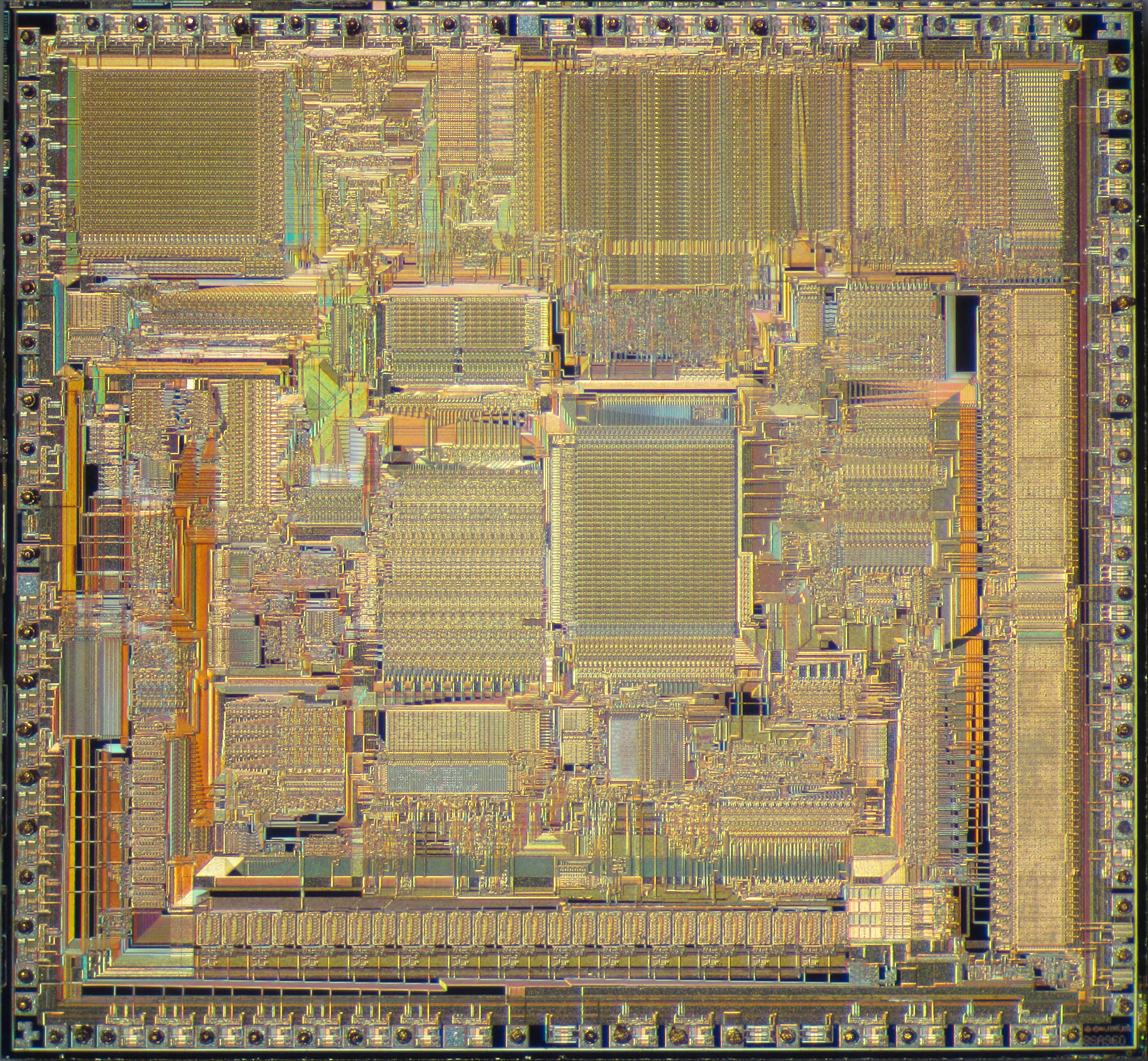
Intel 80960SA

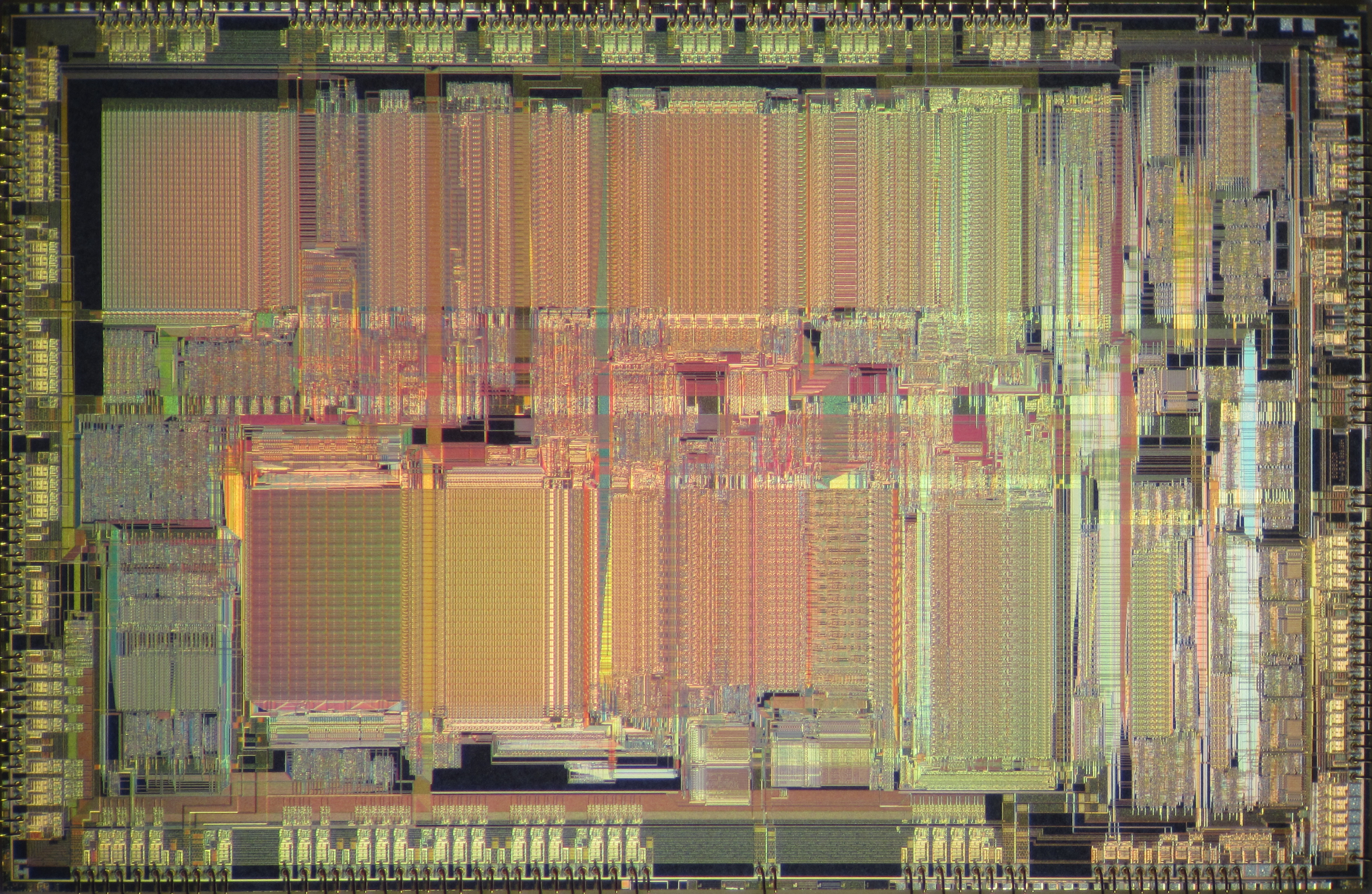
Intel 80960CA

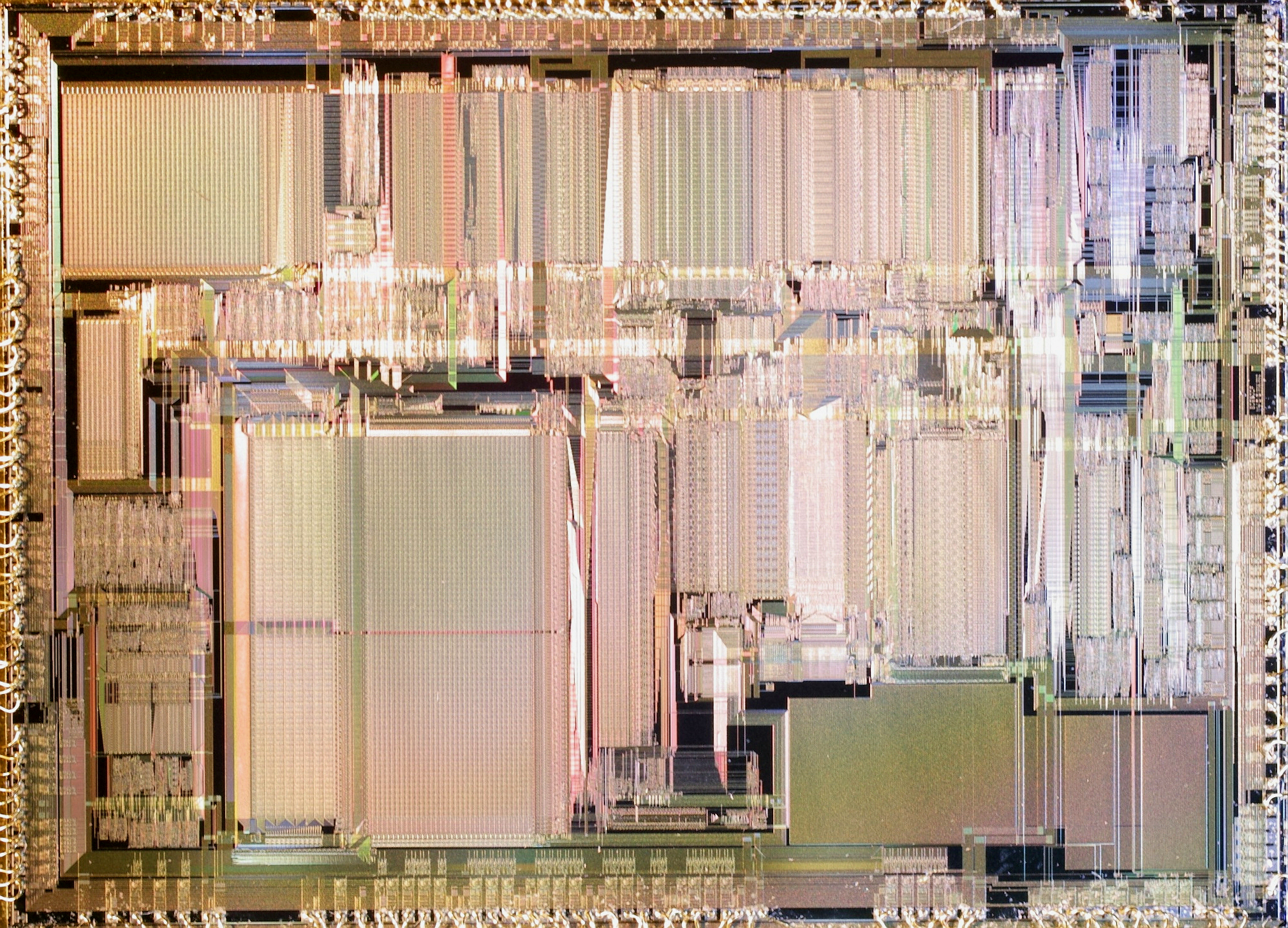
Intel 80960CF

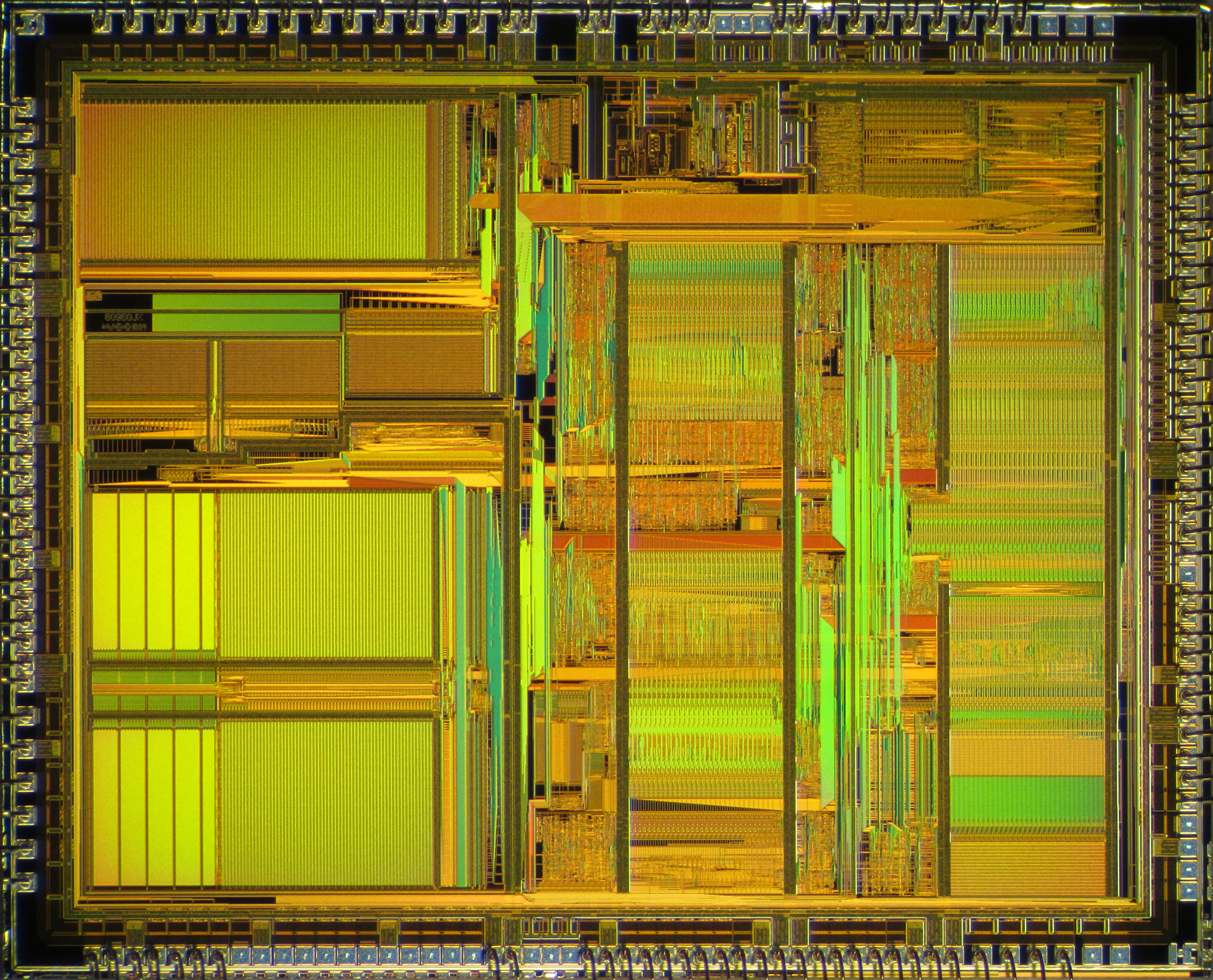
Intel 80960JA

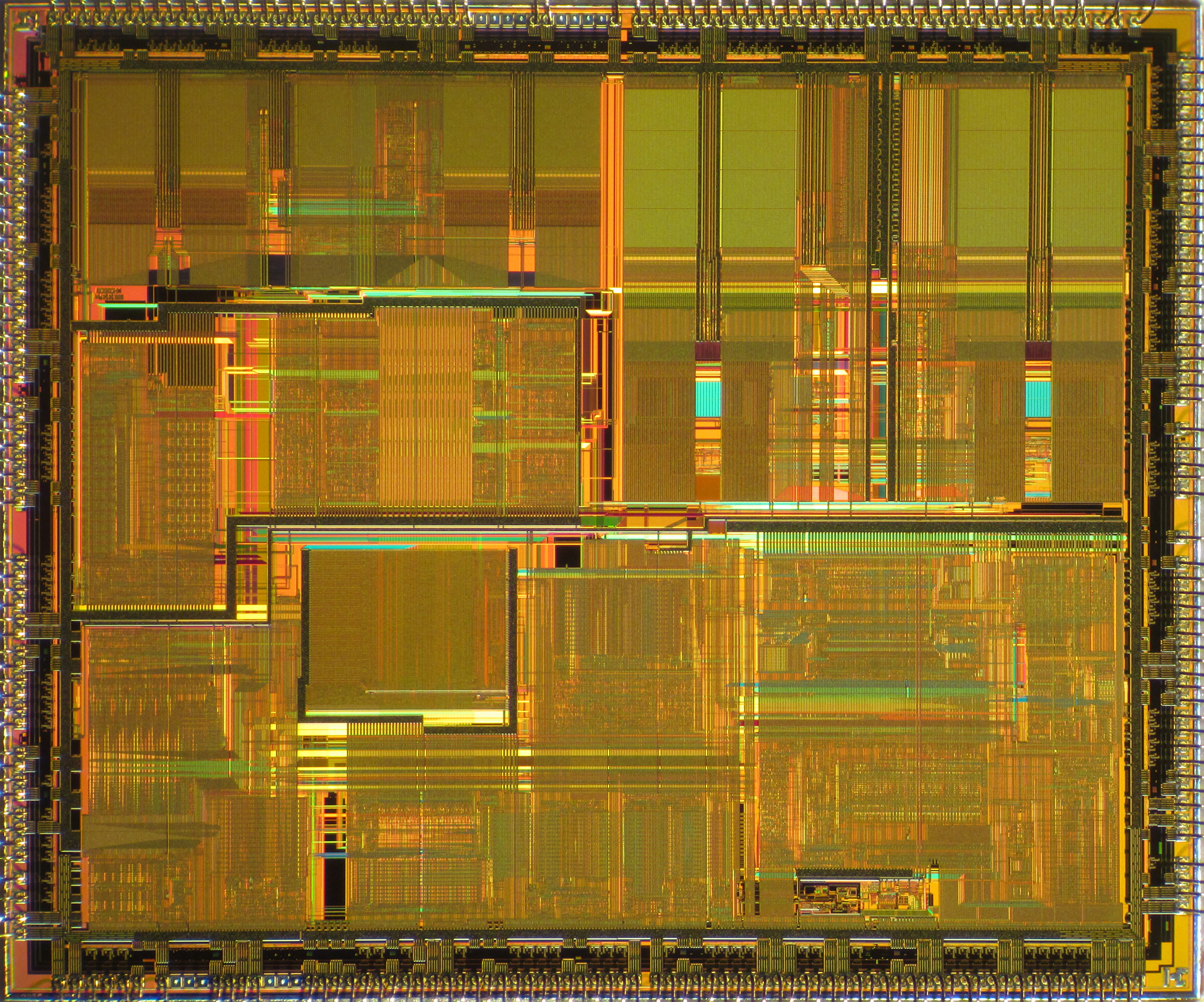
Intel 80960HD

== End of development ==
Intel attempted to bolster the i960 in the I/O device controller market with the I2O standard, but this had little success and the design work was eventually ended. By the mid-1990s its price/performance ratio had fallen behind competing chips of more recent design, and Intel never produced a reduced-power-consumption version that could be used in battery-powered systems.

In 1990, the i960 team was redirected to be the "second team" working in parallel on future i386 implementations—specifically the P6 processor, which later became the Pentium Pro. The i960 project was given to another smaller development team, essentially ensuring the end of its developmental life.

== Current status ==
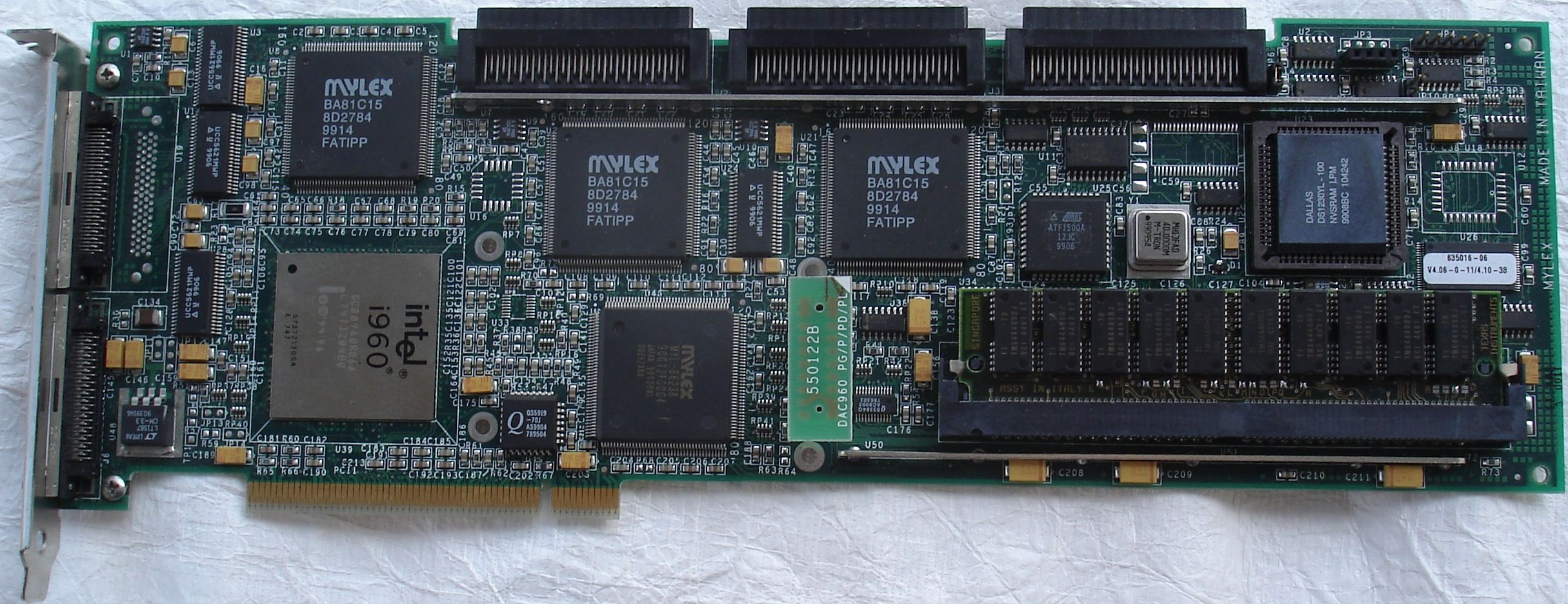
Mylex SCSI RAID controller for PCI bus uses an i960

Some i960 I/O processors, such as the 80303, include a built-in hardware XOR engine for RAID algorithms. They are used as controllers for higher-end, RAID-capable, SCSI-disk-array, host-adapter cards as well as Digital Equipment/Compaq/HP's high-end SCSI and DSSI, and eventually Fibre Channel HSx-series, standalone RAID controllers.

An i960RS chip also powers Adaptec's AAR-2400A controller, which uses four commodity parallel ATA drives to build an affordable RAID-5 protected fault-tolerant storage system for small PC servers and workstations.

The i960 was also used in some Brocade Fibre Channel switches to run Fabric OS.

The i960 architecture is also used in slot machines. Currently, they are found in IGT's Stepper S2000 family and i960 video family. It was also used as the main CPU of Sega's famous Model 2 series of arcade boards.

The Indian Air Force's HAL Tejas light combat aircraft's MMR (multi-mode radar) is said to use the i960. The HAL Tejas was introduced into service in 2015. The Indian Space Research Organisation (ISRO) is said to use the chip in its on-board computers in its launch vehicles.

The i960 processor is also used in Automatic Radar Plotting Aid (ARPA) interfacing boards in radars from Kelvin Hughes.

The chip was used on some HP X-Terminals.

Some SATA RAID controllers use Intel's 80303 IOP (Intelligent I/O Processor), which integrates a PCI-to-PCI bridge, memory controller, and a 80960JT-100 CPU core.

The chip was used on the Alcatel-Lucent 1000 ADSL broadband modem.

The Distributed Inverter (Di) series of elevators, produced by LG Industrial Systems during (later Otis Elevator Korea/Sigma Elevator Company) used the i960 processor in the group control board (known as DOC-220).
