= Millennium Cohort Family Study =

The Millennium Cohort Family Study, a sub-study of the Millennium Cohort Study, is a United States Department of Defense-sponsored project designed to evaluate the short- and long-term effects of the military experience on Service members and their families. Both studies are conducted at the Naval Health Research Center in San Diego, California. The research teams include: uniformed officers as well as investigators from the Department of Defense and academic institutions.

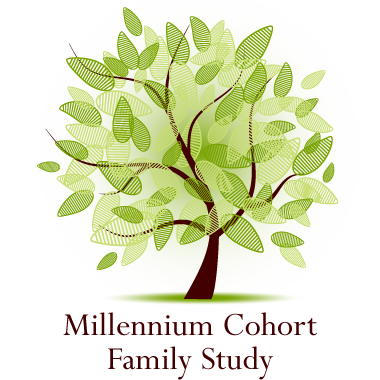

== Purpose ==
The purpose of the Millennium Cohort Family Study is to gain a more complete understanding of the military experience and its impact on the health and well-being of Service members and their families. The Family Study explores the impact of relationship quality on the physical and psychological health of Service members, their spouses and children. It aims to provide understanding of challenges faced by military families.

A cohort study follows a distinct group of people over an extended period of time. In epidemiological research, only a cohort study has the strength to describe long-term health outcomes that are of concern to the military. Important health facts, which may seem obvious now, were not always known to be true—they were learned through cohort studies. For example, we know that smoking causes lung cancer and that untreated high blood pressure causes heart disease, but less than 50 years ago, these relationships were not clear.

== Background ==
More than 5 million US military personnel have been deployed in support of the operations in Iraq and Afghanistan, with nearly 800,000 deploying multiple times and over 3 million children and spouses directly affected by the deployment of a Service member. Family relationships play an important role in the functioning and well-being of US military Service members, yet few studies have examined the impact of deployment and occupational exposures on family members.

== Study design ==
The Family Study is a longitudinal study designed to follow spouses of Service members from all branches of the military, including the National Guard and Reserve, for 21 years. Spouses of Service members participating in the Millennium Cohort Study were invited to complete a baseline questionnaire between 2011 and 2013 and will be re-surveyed every three years. Because families and family relationships change over time, spouses are asked to complete follow-up surveys every three years, even if their spouse is no longer in the service or their marital status changes. The questionnaire asks participants about their mental and physical health, the quality of their marital and family relationships, their deployment and reunion experiences, their perception of how their spouse is coping, and the effects of military life and deployment on their children. Participation in the Family Study is completely voluntary.
