= Intel 80130 =

Support chip for Intel 8086/8088

The Intel 80130, referred to as an "Operating System Processor," was developed as a support chip for the 8086/8088 processors and the Intel iRMX86 operating system. Intel referred to the chip as "software in silicon".

== Overview ==
It contained 16-KB of ROM containing the code for 35 of the iRMX 86 system calls, an interrupt controller similar to the 8259A, timing circuits, a baud generator circuit, and all the necessary circuitry for bus buffering and control.

It was not used in the IBM/PC, and as such, is a less prominent chip.

== Architecture ==
The 80130 uses an object-oriented architecture, with objects representing tasks, jobs, mailboxes, regions, and segments. These objects are acted upon by primitives, which are invokable as PL/M-86 procedures.
