= Millennium Cohort Study (United States) =

The Millennium Cohort Study is an ongoing longitudinal cohort study headquartered at the Naval Health Research Center in San Diego, California and designed to evaluate any long-term health effects of military service, including deployments. It is the largest population-based prospective health project in US military history, currently collecting data on over 265,000 enrolled participants. Investigators that conduct the Millennium Cohort Study include uniformed and non-uniformed scientists from the Army, Navy, Air Force, Department of Veterans Affairs and academic institutions.

== Origin ==
After the 1991 Gulf War, the United States Department of Defense recognized the need to collect prospective exposure and health information that may be associated with the long-term health of service members. The Millennium Cohort Study was designed to address that need. Pilot studies were conducted in 2000; by mid-2001, the Millennium Cohort Study's first enrollment period was launched, collecting baseline data from over 77,000 people.

== Overview ==
The most methodologically rigorous epidemiological study on American military personnel deployed to Iraq and Afghanistan is funded by the US Department of Defense, and supported by military, United States Department of Veterans Affairs, and civilian researchers. Over 200,000 military personnel are members of the cohort. The Millennium Cohort Study began with a random sample of US Military members including active duty, Reserve, and National Guard members from all services. Surveys are sent to this representative sample of US military personnel every three years until 2022, through email and the United States Postal Service, requesting that they submit their data online or via the mail service. Approximately 42% of Millennium Cohort participants have left military service and the study will continue to follow all participants through their Active duty, Reserve, National Guard careers and civilian endeavors.

== Research ==
Prospective data analyses are underway to assess health outcomes including Suicide, Posttraumatic stress disorder, depression, hypertension, respiratory symptoms and illness, immune responses, chronic multi-symptom illness, CHD and CVD, and modifiable health behaviors such as smoking, alcohol use, sleep, and physical activity that may be associated with deployment in support of the current wars. Currently, more than 60% of Millennium Cohort participants have deployed in support of the wars in Iraq and Afghanistan.

== Expansion ==
In 2011 the Millennium Cohort Study was expanded to include 10,000 spouses of Millennium Cohort members. The substudy, The Millennium Cohort Family Study's goal is to gain a more complete understanding of the military experience and its resultant impact on the health and well-being of service members and their families.

In 2020 invitations were sent to an additional 500,000 service members, including active duty, Reserve, and National Guard personnel. Invited participants will receive an email to their Department of Defense (DoD)-registered email address. The new members will be asked to complete a confidential online survey asking for input on their individual experiences in the military. They will also be asked to participate in follow-up surveys through their military service and beyond.
