= Dark Illustrated =

- Formation: 1994
- Dissolved: 1999
- Purpose: Artscene
- Location: Canada

Digital Artists of a Rare Kind, later known as Dark Illustrated, or simply Dark was an underground computer artscene group that primarily released ANSI, ASCII, and high resolution artwork from 1994 to 1999. Though the organization did not operate as long as ACiD, iCE, or CiA, Dark was a very influential and critically successful group. Dark was especially popular with Canadian ANSI artists, who made up a large portion of the member base.

== Releases ==
Dark artwork in ANSI format.

Dark's monthly artpacks, referred to as "collections", were organized a bit differently than other artscene groups. While the naming scheme for the collections was the common "month/year" format (i.e. DARK0295.ZIP for Dark Collection 02/95, or February 1995), Dark titled the digital artwork files themselves in a unique manner.

Dark chose not to follow the traditional "two character" artist abbreviation format, where the first two characters of an 8.3 filename are reserved for artist initials, followed by a dash, then a five character title. Instead the first five characters were reserved for the artist's name, followed by a dash, then a two digit number representing how many pieces the artist had released for the year. In addition, Dark, not unlike artscene groups such as Cia and iCE, used a shortened version of their group name as the file suffix for ANSI files. In this case, .ANS became .DRK.

Dark was also the only artscene group to release annual "best of" compilations.

=== Collections ===
- Dark Collection #01 (first collection)
- Dark Collection #44 Disk A (final collection)
- Dark Collection #44 Disk B
- Dark Collection #44 Disk C

=== Annual Best of Compilations ===
- Dark Best of 1994
- Dark Best of 1995
- Dark Best of 1996
- Dark Best of 1997
- Dark Best of 1998
