= Blade (artscene group) =

- Formation: 1994
- Dissolved: 1998
- Purpose: Artscene
- Location: United States
- Founders: Mindcrime

Blade, also referred to as The Blade Nation, was an underground computer artscene group that primarily released ANSI, ASCII, and high resolution artwork from 1994 to 1997, and during a brief time in 1998.

== History ==
Blade Promotional Artwork in ANSI format.

The group was founded in New Jersey by ANSI Artist, Sub Zero. Due to the confusion between many artists with the handle Sub Zero, his name was changed to Mindcrime after the first Blade release.

Blade developed a long-standing rivalry with another artscene group headquartered in New Jersey, Creators of Intense Art.

In 1996 Blade took part in Canadian artscene group Mistigris's World Tour, under which Mistigris released its artwork in other group's artpacks, as opposed to its own.

== Releases ==
Blade released 43 monthly artpacks beginning with the first "Blade Epic" in March 1994. After the 43rd release, several months passed until the final 44th artpack was released.

- Blade Epic #01 (First Epic)
- Blade Epic #27 (Mistigris World Tour)
- Blade Epic #44 (Final Epic)
