= Creators of Intense Art =

Creators of Intense Art (Cia)
- Formation: 1993
- Dissolved: 2001
- Purpose: Artscene
- Location: United States

This article details the artscene group, Cia. For information regarding the warez group CiA see List of warez groups

Creators of Intense Art, or Cia was an underground computer artscene group that primarily released ANSI, ASCII, and high resolution artwork from 1993 to 2001. Along with iCE and ACiD, Cia was one of the most active, and longest lasting groups on the artscene.

== History ==
Cia "Hirez" Artwork.

Creators of Intense Art was founded during the summer of 1993 by a collective of ANSI artists and demo coders. Like other artscene groups at the time, members communicated primarily through the use of dial up bulletin board systems. The senior staff positions constantly changed hands during Cia's eight-year run, and it was ANSI artist Andrew Bell, under the pseudonym of Napalm, that kept the group on track . Though Napalm drifted in and out of the "president" position, he was always recognized as the head of Cia.

Not unlike the rivalry between iCE and ACiD, there was highly visible competition between Cia and the members of artscene group Blade.

The 21st century was met with declining interest among Cia members, and the underground computer artscene in general. In early 2001, Napalm quietly disbanded Cia and its members pursued other artistic projects.

== Releases ==
Content was released monthly in the form of an artpack, referred to as a "conspiracy". 77 conspiracies were released by Cia, with 72 currently available for download on the internet. Conspiracies were packaged with zip compression and included a monthly memberlist and newsletter.

Beginning with the 73rd release, conspiracies consisted strictly of high resolution artwork, and included HTML files with the artwork embedded.

=== Conspiracies ===
- Cia Conspiracy #05 (earliest available online)
- Cia Conspiracy #50 Disk A
- Cia Conspiracy #50 Disk B
- Cia Conspiracy #50 Disk C
- Cia Conspiracy #73 (first release in HTML format)
- Cia Conspiracy #77 (final release)

=== Image viewer ===
- Wiretap, MS-DOS mode multi format viewer

=== Image editor ===
- Ciadraw, MS-DOS ANSI, ASCII and ADF editor
