= RaD Man =

American computer artist and historian

Christian Wirth (born in the 1970s), better known by the pseudonym RaD Man, is an American computer artist and historian. He works in the field of ANSI art, a method of creating art using a limited set of text characters and color escape codes based loosely on the relevant ANSI standard (X3.64: Control Sequences for Video Terminals and Peripherals).

RaD Man was initially involved with the Aces of ANSI Art (AAA), an organization which created ANSI artwork for a number of computer bulletin board systems from 1989 to 1991. With others, he created the "ANSI Creators in Demand" group (also known as ACiD).

Starting in 1990, ACiD released artwork on an ad hoc network of BBSes, updating a collection of art known as the ACiD Acquisition by sending a compressed file of all the completed work up to that time. By 1992, the increasing file size made this process impractical, and this led to the development of the artpack, where groups of artists (including ACiD) would upload monthly update packages instead. In early 2004, RaD Man directed and produced ACiD Acquisition Update #100, colloquially known as "ACiD-100, the final artpack released by ACiD as a group.

In 1996, RaD Man founded the ACiD Artpacks Archive to collect the artpacks created by the hundreds of groups that followed in ACiD's footsteps. This collection eventually was transferred to DVD as Dark Domain: the artpacks.acid.org collection in 2004.

Since 2002, RaD Man has worked as a historian and spokesperson for the artscene, collecting information and interviews with the artists involved, and creating reports and presentations on the lineage of computer art. Some of this work includes The ARTS, a talk radio show which discusses the many different facets of the creative computer underground scenes and the Pilgrimage 2004 demoparty.

In 2006, RaD Man became a member of cDc's Ninja Strike Force.

In 2007, he co-founded Blockparty with Jason Scott, a North American demoparty. The event was produced in cooperation with Notacon and took place annually in Cleveland, Ohio, from 2007 to 2010.

In November 2009, ANSI art group Blocktronics paid tribute to RaD Man and his contributions to the ANSI art scene by releasing an artpack titled "Codename Chris Wirth".
