= Block art =

Block art may refer to:

- Art built from Lego
- ANSI art
- PETSCII art
- Box-drawing characters
- Text semigraphics
