= CIA (disambiguation) =

CIA is the Central Intelligence Agency, the national foreign intelligence agency of the United States.

CIA, cia, or Cia may also refer to:

== Airports ==
- Chennai International Airport, Tamil Nadu, India
- Clark International Airport, Pampanga, Philippines
- Coimbatore International Airport, Tamil Nadu, India
- Rome Ciampino Airport, Italy (IATA code: CIA)

== Arts, media, and entertainment ==
- "CIA", a placeholder title for an unidentified song believed to have originated from Canada in the 1980s
- C.I.A. (band), an American hip-hop group
- CIA (TV series), an American television series
- Cambala Investigation Agency, an Indian television series
- Comrade in America, a 2017 film directed by Amal Neerad
- "The CIA", a 2023 song by Glass Beach from the album Plastic Death

== Education ==
- Cleveland Institute of Art, an art school in Ohio, United States
- The Art Institute of Colorado, a former institution in Denver, United States
- The Culinary Institute of America, a private culinary school in New York, United States

== Organizations ==
- Central India Agency, a former political agency of the British Raj
- California Institute of Abnormalarts, a nightclub in North Hollywood, United States
- CAN in Automation, a Controller Area Network organization
- Canadian Institute of Actuaries, a Canadian professional body
- Chemical Industries Association, an organization in the United Kingdom
- Chilkoot Indian Association, a federally recognized Native American tribe in Alaska
- Creators of Intense Art, a computer art organization

== Technology ==
- CIA triad (confidentiality, integrity, and availability), in information security
- MOS Technology CIA, an integrated circuit

== Other uses ==
- Cardiff International Arena, an indoor arena in Cardiff, Wales
- Certified Internal Auditor, a professional designation from the Institute of Internal Auditors
- Cia-Cia language (ISO 639-3 code: cia)

== See also ==
- Sia (disambiguation)
- Chia (disambiguation)
