= 20 GOTO 10 =

Art gallery in San Francisco (2008–2012)

Coordinates: 37.78632°N 122.41430°W

20 GOTO 10 was an art gallery in operation from 2008 to 2012, founded by Christopher Abad in San Francisco, California, United States.

== History ==
Its name is a reference to the traditional looping 'Hello world' program written by beginner programmers using the GOTO command. It featured both traditional and "hacker" art, with an emphasis on technology as art, or exhibits which make the potentially criminal or unethical aspects of computer security accessible to the public.

It received more prominent vlog, blog, and print news coverage when Kevin Olson displayed the first ever American showing of ANSI art in a physical art gallery. Jason Scott Sadofsky, creator of the BBS Documentary expressed interest in the custom LCD scrollers based on a Parallax chipset with a custom ANSI scroller to VGA output written in SPIN made solely for the ANSI gallery show.

The gallery was located at 679 Geary Street in San Francisco, and was defunct at this location as of Summer 2012.
