= JGS =

JGS may refer to:

- Jesse H. Jones Graduate School of Business, part of Rice University in Houston, Texas, United States
- Jinggangshan Airport, in Jiangxi province, China
- Joan Stark, American artist
- Joint General Staff, the defunct high command of the Republic of Vietnam Military Forces
- Journal of the Geological Society
- Jungshahi railway station, in Sindh, Pakistan
- the Book of Judges, as the shorter of two common abbreviations
