= Aces of ANSI Art =

Group of artists

- Formation: 1989
- Dissolved: 1991
- Purpose: Artscene
- Location: United States
- Origin: San Jose, California
- Founders: Zyphril; Chips Ahoy

Aces of ANSI Art (abbreviated as <A.A.A>) was the first group of artists specifically organized for the purposes of creating and distributing ANSI art. The group was founded and operated by two BBS enthusiasts from California, "Zyphril" and "Chips Ahoy", from 1989 through 1991.

== History ==
The group was initially formed in 1989 during the BBS era, but soon after the group's founding, ANSI art groups took on a life of their own, growing increasingly popular and spawning what would come to be known as the "artscene." ANSI art, which initially began as a method for bulletin board sysops to draw users to their boards, but with the emergence of organized groups, the artscene became associated with "underground" culture, such as warez boards.

In 1990, a schism occurred when a small but influential group of members left the group to form ACiD Productions. ACiD (ANSI Creators In Demand) grew to become the first international artscene group.

== Membership ==
- Chips Ahoy (Founder)
- Zyphril (Founder)
- Opus Outland
- RaD Man (Senior member)
- Mondoman
- The Beholder
- Icepirate

== See also ==
- ANSI art
- ASCII art
- Demoscene
- Digital art
- List of artscene groups
- Pixel art
- Software art
