= TheDraw =

Character graphics editor for MS-DOS

- Sample ANSI by TheSoft loaded in TheDraw
- Original author: Ian E. Davis
- Developer: TheSoft Programming Services
- Initial release: January 5, 1986; 40 years ago
- Stable release: 4.63 / October 1993; 32 years ago
- Written in: Turbo Pascal, Assembly language
- Operating system: MS-DOS
- Type: Text editor

TheDraw is a text editor for MS-DOS to create ANSI and animations as well as ASCII art. The editor is especially useful to create or modify files in ANSI format and text documents, which use the graphical characters of the IBM ASCII code pages, because they are not supported by Microsoft Windows anymore. The first version of the editor was developed in 1986 by Ian E. Davis of TheSoft Programming Services. The last public version of the editor was version 4.63, which was released in October 1993.

TheDraw was one of the first ANSI editors that supported ANSIs longer than 25 rows. The limit in the latest available version is still 100 rows. Other editors, such as ACiDDraw are able to support ANSIs larger than 100 lines for a single ANSI/ASCII (ACiDDraw supports 1,000 lines). The animation mode is limited to 50 lines (rows). The column width can be extended from the standard 80 characters to 160, but this also reduces the row limit down to 50.

== Compatibility with Microsoft Windows ==
The program is stable in an MS-DOS Window on Windows XP and allows the user to maintain mouse control. Used with Windows Vista however, TheDraw performs with less predictable results. It works with DOSBox.

== Significant features ==
Some of the features of the editor include:

- Mouse support to select blocks of text within the editor (even under Windows in window and full-screen mode)
- For the selected area/block exist a number of unique functions

- Fill function to change the color of a whole section of the text
- Copy/Move and Paste function to copy/move entire blocks of text within the document.
- Erase function that clears the selected area of any characters without the surrounding characters changing position.
- Replace function to replace the content of the selected area with the content of the TheDraw "clipboard".
- Load/Save function to save only the selected area or load an ANSI/ASCII from the hard disk into the selected area (replace).

- Font manager to create/modify and organize ASCII and ANSI fonts to be used within the editor
- Additional file formats in addition to ANSI (.ANS) and text (.ASC).

- The proprietary PCBoard (.PCB) and Wildcat! BBS (.BBS) file formats.
- The AVATAR (.AVT) file standard defined by FidoNet.
- Save files for various programming languages, including Assembly (.ASM), C (.H) and Turbo Pascal (.PAS).
- Ability to save ANSIs as .COM binary, .BIN and object code (.OBJ).
- Other supported formats: BSave (.BSV) and backup files (.BAK)

- Comprehensive help screens
- Preset transition animations to wipe or change the image
- ANSI animation support (creation and modification)
- The "Draw Mode" used automatically the appropriate character from the currently selected set to draw lines and corners by simply using the cursor keys (up/down/left/right)
- The default character sets can be modified and extended

== See also ==
- ASCII art
- ANSI art
- List of text editors (ASCII and ANSI art section)
