= BBS: The Documentary =

2005 documentary film

- DVD cover
- Directed by: Jason Scott
- Written by: Jason Scott
- Produced by: Nicole Sparks
- Edited by: Jason Scott
- Release date: May 2005
- Running time: 4 hours 58 minutes
- Language: English

Episode 1 (The other episodes are on Commons here.)

BBS: The Documentary (commonly referred to as BBS Documentary) is a 3-disc, 8-episode documentary about the subculture born from the creation of the bulletin board system (BBS) filmed by computer historian Jason Scott of textfiles.com.

Production work began in July 2001, and completed in December 2004. The finished product began shipping in May 2005.

Although the documentary was released under the Creative Commons Attribute-ShareAlike 2.0 License and later under 3.0, meaning that anyone can legally download it for free, the author has made it known that the downloadable version is only a fraction of the available material and recommends that individuals purchase the documentary DVDs.

== Episodes ==
Disc 1:

1. Baud: the beginnings of the first BBSes, featuring Ward Christensen and Randy Suess
2. SysOps and Users: experiences from those who used and operated BBSes, including B.W. Behling from Ahoy! magazine

Disc 2:

1. Make it Pay: the BBS industry of the 1980s and 90s featuring Philip L. Becker, founder of eSoft
2. FidoNet: details the largest volunteer-run computer network in history
3. Artscene: the history of the ANSI Art Scene which thrived in the BBS world

Disc 3:

1. HPAC (Hacking Phreaking Anarchy Cracking): hear from the users of "underground" BBSes
2. No Carrier: the end of the dial-up BBS and its integration into the Internet
3. Compression: the story of the PKWARE/SEA legal battle of the late 1980s

Disc 3 also serves as a DVD-ROM which contains thousands of photographs from the 200 interviews recorded during the 4-year production of the film. All of the episodes are subtitled in English and include director's commentary tracks. The Artscene episode is the only one to include subtitles translated into Russian. All discs include hidden easter eggs.

== Reception ==
BBS: The Documentary was well reviewed, mainly by publications within the technology space. Wired called it "a five-and-a-half-hour paean to the era when computers were named Stacy and Lisa, and tech loyalists fought bitter battles over the superiority of Ataris to Amigas". Film Threat called it a "truly fascinating documentary about an increasingly obscure and obsolete technology". Popular Mechanics called it a "labor of love" and said it was "the sort of thing that not everyone can digest, but is utterly fascinating to those that can".

Since its release, the film has been cited by multiple academic works on the topic of computing history and internet culture.
