= Angelo Sotira =

American entrepreneur

- Born: February 14, 1981 (age 45); Greece
- Occupation: Entrepreneur
- Known for: Co-founding DeviantArt
- Website: spyed.deviantart.com

Angelo Sotira (born February 14, 1981) is an American entrepreneur who co-founded the online community DeviantArt on August 7, 2000, with Matthew Stephens and Scott Jarkoff.

== Career ==
Angelo co-founded DeviantArt at nineteen, but it was not his first company. Four years earlier, he started a music file-sharing site called Dimension Music. He sold it to Michael Ovitz in 1999, coming off of his stints at Disney and the Creative Artists Agency. Angelo worked the next two years at Ovitz's Artist Management Group & Lynx Technology Group (Ovitz's Internet investment arm) where he advised on how those companies could best strategically integrate the opportunities from emerging commercial applications of the Internet.

As of 2017, Sotira is a member of the Wix management after Wix acquired DeviantArt for $36 million.

== Personal life ==
Sotira was born in Greece on February 14, 1981. Currently, he is living in Hollywood, California.
