= ASCII porn =

Pornographic images depicted through text

ASCII porn, sometimes typographically euphemized as "ASCII pr0n", is the depiction of pornographic images using the medium of ASCII art. ASCII porn was the world's first Internet pornography, and was popular (among the then fewer computer users) before the invention of the World-Wide Web. ASCII porn was often found on BBSes and other text mode terminal-based systems that could be reached via direct modem dial-up. It was also exchanged via sneakernet and on the early Internet using pre-WWW services such as email, telnet, and usenet.

A contributing factor to the relative popularity of ASCII porn in its time was high compatibility: the standard ASCII character set could be displayed on most computer monitors, even on early desktops/terminals incapable of displaying digital images, and could be printed on most printers. Additionally, ASCII porn could be composed by hand using nothing more than a text editor, without the need for a model or camera. As computers developed, it became possible to transmit digital images on the World-Wide Web, and thus ASCII porn slipped into obscurity.

Artists in the late 1990s returned to the form, for instance in the work Deep ASCII, a rendering of the movie Deep Throat, created by Vuk Ćosić of the ASCII Art Ensemble. Concrete poet Florian Cramer also produced ASCII work based on sexually explicit images.
