= Christopher Abad =

American hacker, museum curator, artist, network engineer and programmer

- Occupations: Hacker, museum curator, artist, network engineer and programmer

Christopher Abad is an American hacker, museum curator, artist, network engineer and programmer. He is best known for his qualitative analysis of specialization stratification in the underground economies related to computer crime.

== Academic publication and mainstream news coverage ==
While at UCLA, Abad discovered a method by which collisions in the hash function used in Internet Protocol datagrams may be leveraged to enable covert channel communications. His discovery was a centerpiece of covert communications methodology and was the primary citation for an Association for Computing Machinery paper on covert channel detection and another on a similar technique using TCP timestamps, the two most well-cited and widely republished papers on the subject.

In 2005 while working at Cloudmark, Abad spent six months examining the phishing underworld from the inside. Abad discovered that phishers were using IRC channels in order to trade personal information. He stalked and collected messages from thirteen chat rooms phishers use. Whereas past phishing researchers believed that phishing was coordinated by highly organized criminals, Abad discovered that phishing rings were decentralized. Abad published his findings in First Monday. This paper was the first examination of how the economy of phishing agents functioned, and highlighted the high degree of specialization within the economy.

== 20 GOTO 10 ==
Abad was the founder and owner of 20 GOTO 10 (2008–2012), a former gallery which caters not only to fine art, but to "hacker" art, with an emphasis on technology as art, or exhibits which make the potentially criminal or unethical aspects of computer security accessible to the public. The gallery received many favorable reviews coverage for its airing of art related to the computer underground, including ANSI and 3D art.
