= Temporal typography =

Typography that appears to move or change over time

Temporal typography is typography that appears to move or change over time. It normally appears in screen-based media, and in particular title sequences, TV station idents, and advertising.

Within the field of typography, letterforms typically embody either static or kinetic forms. However there is another category of typography that escapes the purely static or purely kinetic. Unlike static typography, these forms are not bound by one iteration within a singular viewing experience. Similar to kinetic type, temporal typography carries the stamp of time but is not relegated to movement or time-based media.

Temporal letterforms have the ability to manifest themselves in both static and kinetic ways, as well as physical and digital ways, and therefore cannot be evaluated by the same functional factors of traditional typography: legibility and readability. Viewership and perception are elevated, and formal and experiential conditions are re-prioritized as the forms transition from one state to the next.
