= Cowsay =

Program that generates ASCII pictures of a cow with a message

cowsay
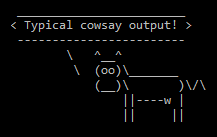
- Original author: Tony Monroe
- Release: 1999
- Stable release: 3.8.4 / 30 November 2024; 23 months ago
- Written in: Perl
- Operating system: Cross-platform
- Available in: English
- License: Artistic License / GNU General Public License
- Website: Official website
- Repository: github.com/cowsay-org/cowsay

cowsay is a program that generates ASCII art pictures of a cow with a message. It can also generate pictures using pre-made images of other animals, such as Tux the Penguin, the Linux mascot. It is written in Perl. There is also a related program called cowthink, with cows with thought bubbles rather than speech bubbles. .cow files for cowsay exist which are able to produce different variants of cows, with different kinds of eyes, and so forth. It is sometimes used on IRC, desktop screenshots, and in software documentation. It is more or less a joke within hacker culture, but has been around long enough that its use is rather widespread. In 2007, it was highlighted as a Debian package of the day.

cowsay is excluded from Parabola GNU/Linux-libre on the basis of the presence of "dubious and objectionable cows".

== Example ==
The Unix command fortune can also be piped into the cowsay command:

[user@hostname ~]$ fortune | cowsay
 ________________________________________
/ You have Egyptian flu: you're going to \
\ be a mummy.                            /
 ----------------------------------------
        \   ^__^
         \  (oo)\_______
            (__)\       )\/\
                ||----w |
                ||     ||

Using the parameter -f followed by tux, one can replace the cow with other beings, such as Tux, the Linux mascot:

[user@hostname ~]$ fortune | cowsay -f tux
 _________________________________________
/ You are only young once, but you can    \
\ stay immature indefinitely.             /
 -----------------------------------------
   \
    \
        .--.
       |o_o |
       |:_/ |
      //   \ \
     (|     | )
    /'\_   _/`\
    \___)=(___/

Using the parameter -l shows all available cow files:

[user@hostname ~]$ cowsay -l
Cow files in /usr/share/cowsay/cows:
apt bud-frogs bunny calvin cheese cock cower daemon default dragon
dragon-and-cow duck elephant elephant-in-snake eyes flaming-sheep fox
ghostbusters gnu hellokitty kangaroo kiss koala kosh luke-koala
mech-and-cow milk moofasa moose pony pony-smaller ren sheep skeleton
snowman stegosaurus stimpy suse three-eyes turkey turtle tux unipony
unipony-smaller vader vader-koala www

== Parameters ==
Option	Purpose
-n	Disables word wrap, allowing the cow to speak FIGlet or to display other embedded ASCII art. Width in columns becomes that of the longest line, ignoring any value of -W. Only works with text from stdin.
-W	Specifies width of the speech balloon in columns, i.e. characters in a monospace font. Default value is 40.
-b	“Borg mode”, uses == in place of oo for the cow′s eyes.
-d	“Dead”, uses XX, plus a descending U to represent an extruded tongue, also used on Linux kernel oops.
-g	“Greedy”, uses $$.
-p	“Paranoid”, uses @@.
-s	“Stoned”, uses ** to represent bloodshot eyes, plus a descending U to represent an extruded tongue.
-t	“Tired”, uses --.
-w	“Wired”, uses OO.
-y	“Youthful”, uses .. to represent smaller eyes.
-e eye_string	Manually specifies the cow′s eye-type, e.g. cowsay -e ^^ (see Eastern-style emoticon).
-T tongue_string	Manually specifies the cow′s tongue shape, e.g. cowsay -T \(\) for a pair of parentheses.
-f cowfile	Specifies a .cow file from which to load alternative ASCII art. Accepts both absolute file-paths and those relative to the environment variable COWPATH.
-l	Lists the names of available cow-files in the COWPATH directory instead of displaying a quote.
