= FIG Script =

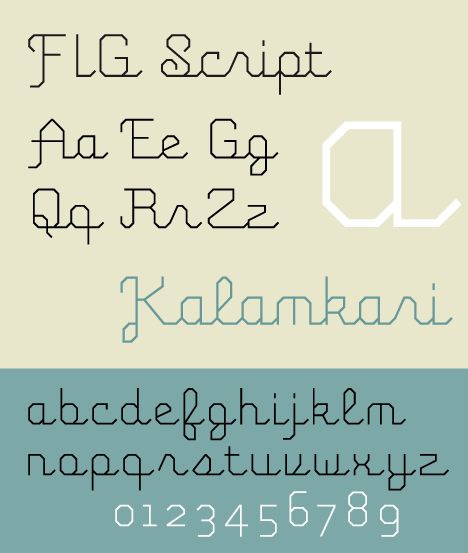
- Category: Formal script
- Designer: Eric Olson
- Foundry: Process Type Foundry
- Date created: 2002

FIG Script is a typeface designed by Eric Olson in 2002 for Process Type Foundry.

The name FIG is an acronym for "Frank (Sheeran), Ian (Chai), and Glenn (Chappell) who collaborated in the development of the FIGlet computer program developed to generate text banners, in a variety of typefaces, composed of letters made up of arrangements of smaller ASCII characters. Olson used FIGlet in creating his ASCII-based FIG typefaces. Olson describes the FIG types as an "exploration into the generative possibilities type design software and simple grid structures." While suggestion of a raster is clearly visible in the face, a hominess similar to that found in nineteenth century cross-stitched samplers is also found. Many characters have swashes, and the overall effect is reminiscent of cursive.

== See also ==
- Samples of display typefaces
