= TBBS =

TBBS is an acronym that may refer to

- The Bread Board System, a DOS based commercial bulletin board system, or
- Total Body Bone Scan, a nuclear diagnostic imaging technique
