= Minor artscene groups =

This is a list of the minor computer underground artscene groups spanning from roughly 1992 to the present day.

== 1 ==
- 123 "123 ASCII" : 2000–2004
- 27 Inch : 2003–2004
- 765 "The Girl Scouts" : 1996

== A ==
- ACE : 1993
- AiM "Art in Madness" : 1995
- ALiVE "ALiVE Productions" : 1994
- Anemia : 1995–1996
- Apocalyptic Visions : 1994–1998
- Apathy : 1995–1996
- ATOMiC : 1991–1994
- Avenge : 1998–1999
- AWE "Awe Lettering" : 1996–1999

== B ==
- B2B "Back to the Basix" : 1995
- BAD "Bitchin' ANSI Design" : 1993–1994
- Black Maiden : 1985–2008
- Bleach : 1995
- Blend : 1996–1997
- Blur : 1996
- Boil : 1997–1998
- BROkEN : 1995–1996

== C ==
- CANCER : 1994–1995
- Cenobite : ????-????
- CHAOS "Total Chaos" : 1992–1993

== D ==
- DiE : 1993–1994

== E ==
- Echo : 1997–1998
- Eclipse : 1994–1997
- EDEN : 1994–1995
- EGA : 1996
- EP "Extended Play" : 1996–1998
- Epic "Epic Arts" : 1999–2000
- ETERNiTY : 1993
- Everglo : 1997

== F ==
- FAT "Futuristic Artists with Talent" : 1994
- Fact! : 1996
- FORCE : 1995–1998
- FOKUS "Fokus Fonting" : 1999
- FOS "Fistful of Steel" : 1996–1997
- FUEL : 1995–1998, 2017–2019
- Function : 1998
- Fusion : 19??-19??

== G ==
- Galza "HRG's Ascii Art Division" : 1999–
- Glue : 1997–2001
- GRiP-AD "Graphic Revolution in Progress – Art Division" : 1993–1995
- GOTHiC : 1993
- Gravity : 1996

== H ==
- Hallucigenia : 1998–1999
- HoA "HighOnASCii" : 2003–2004
- HRG "Hellraiser Group" : 1996–2000

== I ==
- iMPERiAL : 1994
- Innate : ????
- Integrity : 1995

== K ==
- Karma : 1998
- KTS "Katharsis" : 1994–1995
- KND "Kindred" : 1996–1997

== L ==
- Lapse : 1994
- Lazarus : 1996–1997, 2020–present
- Legacy : 1993
- Legend : 1995–1996
- Legion : 1998
- Leper Society : 1994–1996
- LiE "Liquid iCE Enterprises" : 1996

== M ==
- Maiden "Maiden Brazil" : 1996–1998
- MAD : 1994
- Mean Scheme : 1996–1997
- MiRAGE : 1992
- MiSTiGRiS : 1994–1998, 2014–present
- mOp "Monkeys on Porches" : 1995–1996

== N ==
- NATiON : 1994–1995
- Nerp : 1997–1998
- Nettwerk: 1994–1997
- NWA "New Wave Artists" : 1994

== O ==
- Ocean5 : 2010 –
- Odelay : 1996–1998
- Odium : 1995–1996
- oOps!ascii : 19??-19??
- Ophidiac : 1996
- Opium "Opium Graphics" : 1995–1997

== P ==
- Pain! : 1995–1996
- Phantasm: 1995–?
- Phat: 1995–1997
- PHUX: 1997–2003
- Plain : 1996
- PLF "Poffelipoff Productions" : 1997–1999
- the Project : 1999
- PURG "Phucked Up ReneGade" : 1996–1999

== R ==
- RAT "Rippin' Artistic Talent" : 1990–1999
- RCA "Real Crazy Artists" : 1996–1998
- RELiC : 1992–1997
- Revival : 2002
- RGR "RiGoR" : 1996–1998
- RIOT "Revolution In Our Time" : 1993–1994
- Riot : 1997–1998
- ROC "Rulers of Chaos" : 1994–1996

== S ==
- Sadist : 1996-20XX
- Saga : 1995, 1997
- Samsara : 1996
- Scrollz : ????-1999
- Se7en / Vii: 1999, 2003–2004
- Sense : 1997–1998
- Sense "Sense Imagery" : 2002–Present
- Septic : 1996
- Spastic "Spastic Studios" : 1995
- SHaRP : 1994
- SHiVER : 1994–1995
- sOap "Sons of ASCII Prophets" : 1994–1996
- STD : ca. 1995–1997
- STD "Spread The Disease" : 2003
- Stile : 1994–1995

== T ==
- Teklordz Productions : 1994–1997
- The 5th : 1997
- Think : 1997–1998
- TNT "The Next Testament" : 2004–2005
- Trank : 1995–1996
- TRiBE : 1993–1994
- Twilight' : 1997

== U ==
- UNiON : 1994–1995
- Used : 2000

== V ==
- VIIx2 : 2006–Present
- ViViD : 1997–1999
- VOR "Visions of Reality" : 1993

== W ==
- wBALLS : 1994
- WiCKED : 1995–1996
- WOE "WOE!ASCII" : 1996–1998

== Z ==
- Zeitnot : ????-????
- Zenith : 1998

== See also ==
- Computer Art Scene
