= Typewriter mystery game =

Type of typewriter art

A typewriter mystery game is a specific type of typewriter art popular in the mid-20th century.

A typewriter owner would be presented with a set of instructions: press a key this many times, press another key, move on to the next line. Upon finishing the typing, a picture would emerge on the page. First lines of a simple typewriter mystery could look like this:

[1] 2 X, 3 spaces, 2 X, 1 space, 2 X, 3 spaces, 2 X, 2 spaces, 2 X
[2] 2 X, 2 spaces, 7 X, 2 spaces, 2 X, 2 spaces, 2 X              
[3] 2 X, 3 spaces, 5 X, 3 spaces, 2 X, 2 spaces, 2 X              
[4] 2 X, 5 spaces, 1 X, 6 spaces, 4 X                             

which
gives:

XX   XX XX   XX  XX
XX  XXXXXXX  XX  XX
XX   XXXXX   XX  XX
XX     X      XXXX

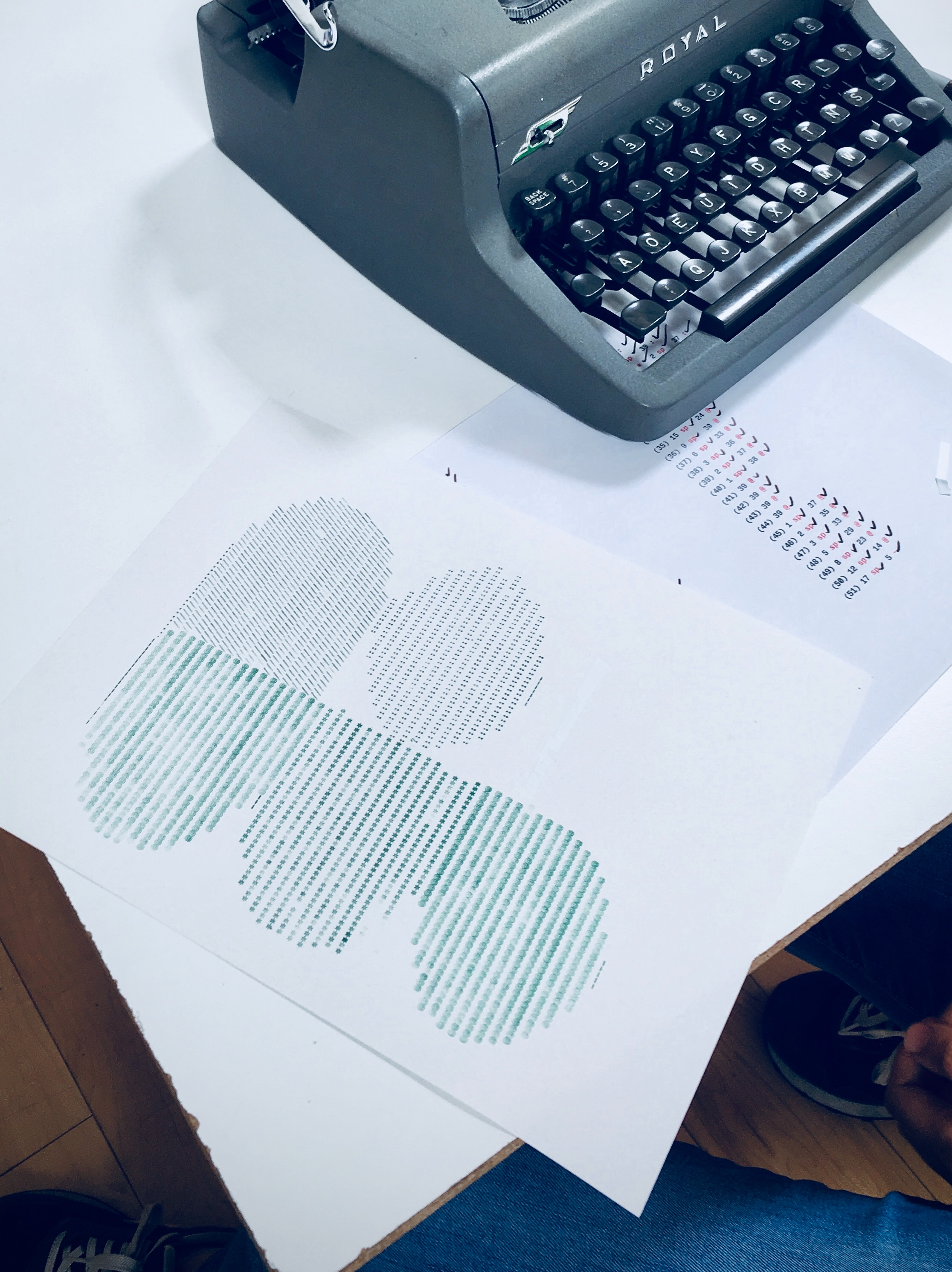
A photo of a typewriter mystery game, its result, and the typewriter it was written on.

Typewriter mystery games were published in magazines (such as Woman's Realm and The Journal of Business Education), and collected in separate books. The “mystery” in the name refers to the fact that a visual result of the instructions would sometimes be presented on a different page, in the following issue of the magazine, or withheld altogether, making typing the only immediate way to discover the picture.

The end result of a typewriter mystery game would be a picture similar to the later ASCII art, except it would often use overtyping – making several passes over the same line, unavailable or difficult on computer screens. The photo would often be a portrait of a person or an animal.

== Photos ==
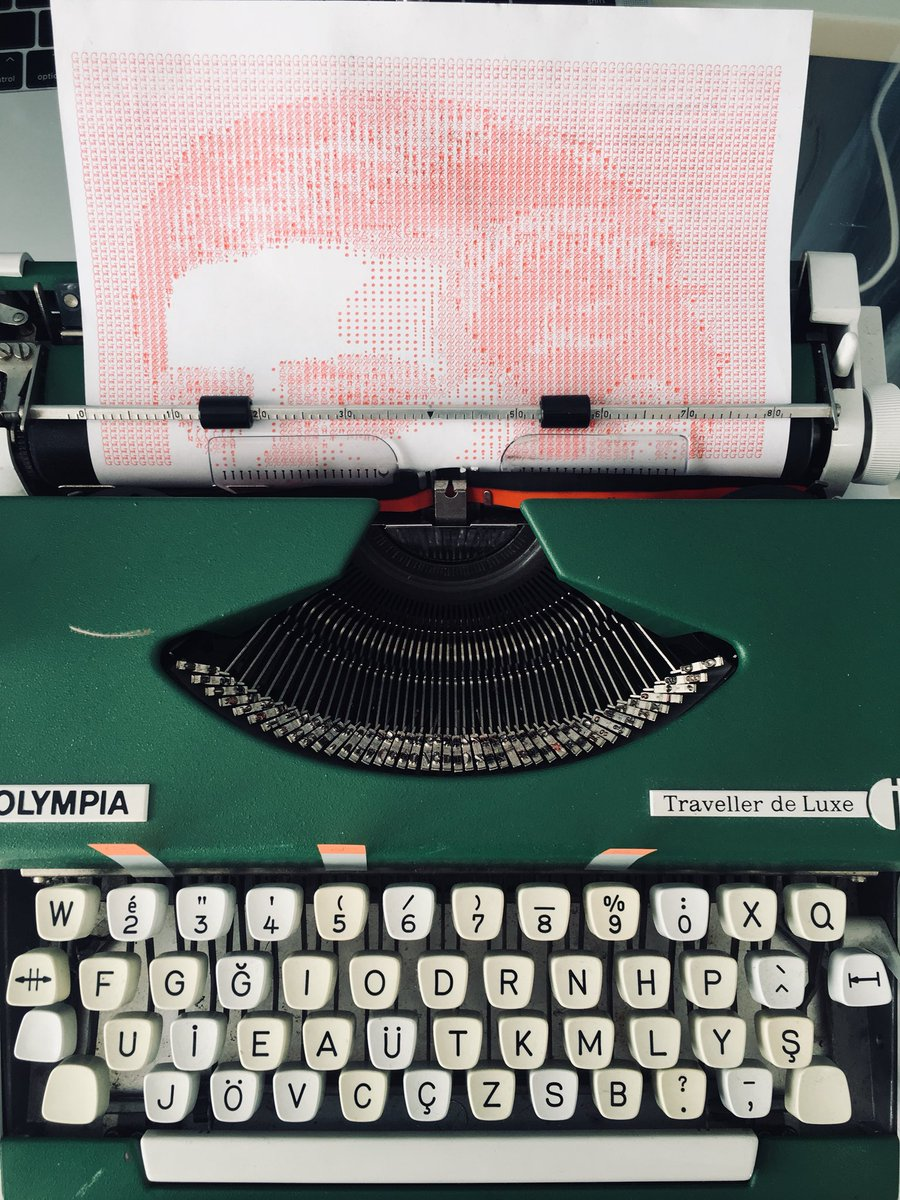
A typewriter mystery game in the process of being typed in

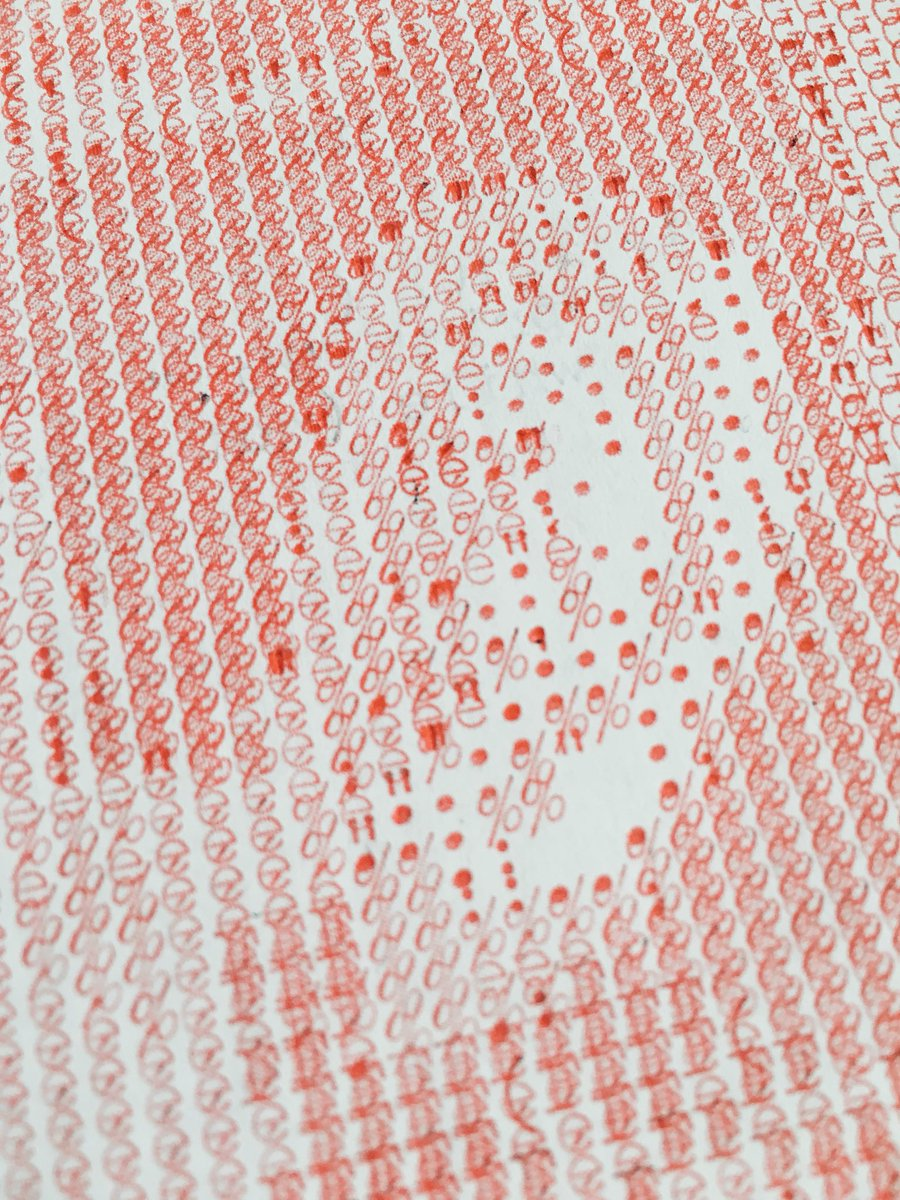
Close-up of a typewritten mystery portrait with the overtyping clearly visible

== Books of typewriter mystery games ==
- 50 Typing Picture Projects by Winnifred Nichols (1980)
- Bob Neill’s Book of Typewriter Art (1982)
- Bob Neill’s Second Book of Typewriter Art (1984)
- Typewriter Mystery Games by Julius Nelson (1951–1979, one example)
- The 1956 book Fun with your typewriter is similar in that it contains many typewritten graphic elements with proper instructions on how to type them (they are not, however, mysteries).
