= Libcaca =

ASCII art software

libcaca
- Developers: Sam Hocevar and Jean-Yves Lamoureux
- Initial release: November 22, 2003(0.1 release)
- Stable release: 0.9 / February 2, 2004; 22 years ago
- Preview release: 0.99.beta20 / October 19, 2021; 4 years ago
- Written in: C
- Operating system: Unix-like, Windows, MS-DOS, OS X
- Available in: English
- License: Free software: WTFPLv2
- Website: libcaca.zoy.org
- Repository: github.com/cacalabs/libcaca

An example Wikipedia logo generated using libcaca 0.99.beta18

libcaca is a software library that converts images into colored ASCII art. It includes the library itself, and several programs including cacaview, an image viewer that works inside a terminal emulator, and img2txt, which can convert an image to other text-based formats.

== Overview ==
libcaca has been used in a variety of programs, including FFmpeg, VLC media player, and MPlayer.

libcaca is free software, licensed under WTFPL version 2.

== Projects using libcaca ==
- Gnuplot
- MPlayer
- FFmpeg
- GStreamer
- VLC media player
- mpv (media player)
- ranger (file manager)

== See also ==
- AAlib
- FFmpeg
