= Joan Stark =

American ASCII artist

Joan G. Stark
- Known for: ASCII art
- Website: Official site, archived Geocities version

         .{{}}}}}}.
       {{{{{}}}}}}}. 
      {{{{  }}}}}}}}}
     }}}}} _   _ {{{{{  
     }}}}  6   6  {{{{  
    {{{{{    ^    }}}}}
   {{{{{{\  -=-  /}}}}}}
   {{{{{{{;.___.;}}}}}}}
    {{{{{{{)   (}}}}}}}'
     `""'"':   :'"'"'`  
   jgs      `@`

Stark's autoportrait and standard signature

Joan G. Stark, also known by her pseudonym Spunk or her initials jgs, is an American ASCII artist.

Stark was first exposed to the art of ASCII in the summer of 1995 and by July 1996 had taken to the creation of ASCII art. From 1996 to 2003 she created several hundred works of art, most of which were posted to the Usenet newsgroup alt.ascii.art. Between 1996 and 1998 her website, which she updated at least once a month, received over 250,000 unique visitors. Stark's involvement in ASCII art has been taken as an example of increased online participation by women, and her imagery as an example of ASCII art becoming "softer, more stereotypically feminine."

Stark works primarily in white-on-black, but creates in color as well. Many of her works have a folk art quality. She works free-hand, with an average of 15–20 minutes at the keyboard apiece.

== Personal life ==
Stark has at least four children.
