= ESoft =

eSoft Inc.
- Type: Web filtering, Spam filtering, Firewall and Information Leak Prevention
- Industry: security
- Founded: 1984
- Founder: Philip L. Becker
- Headquarters: Broomfield, Colorado
- Key people: Bud Michael, CEO
- Products: InstaGate, ThreatWall
- Website: www.esoft.com

eSoft was a Colorado-based company, that ceased operations in December 2013 and specializing in integrated security solutions including secure content management and unified threat management appliances. Privately held eSoft, based in the foothills of Broomfield, Colorado, has developed the award-winning InstaGate and ThreatWall security appliances, as well as modular software bundles called ThreatPaks that provide Email and Web security.

eSoft ceased operations in December, 2013. Some assets were acquired by Untangle, Inc.

== History ==
eSoft was founded by Philip L. Becker in 1984 and started out making and selling the TBBS (bulletin board system) initially targeted at RadioShack TRS-80 [CP/M] machines, but later ported to IBM-PC computers. Software companies like Microsoft relied on TBBS for their online technical support before the advent of the Internet. In 1993 eSoft created a product called the IPAD (Internet Protocol Adapter) in an effort to adapt to the Internet. The IPAD started as a gateway to TBBS using Internet Protocols like FTP and DNS. This evolved into an "internet in a box" solution giving ISPs and companies a point of presence on the Internet with a single appliance purchase.

In March 1998, eSoft went public on the Nasdaq Stock Exchange with the ticker symbol ESFT and by 1999 was trading at $40 per share riding the dot-com era enthusiasm with Linux-based companies. In January 1999, eSoft acquired Apexx Technology Inc., makers of a competing all-in-one appliance. eSoft rebranded its IPAD appliance as TEAM Internet. Following that acquisition, in July 1999 eSoft purchased Technologic, a maker of firewall security appliances, as a way to branch out into the security space. In November of that year, eSoft's stock more than doubled after a $3 million investment from Intel.

In February 2000, Gateway, Inc. announced a plan to invest $25 million in eSoft at a price of $19.51 per share, but after the first installment of $12.5 million, eSoft's falling share price caused Gateway to attempt renegotiate its investment. In September 2000, eSoft signed a deal that licensed its Redphish Linux-based security platform to 3Com. By January 2002, the dot-com bubble's burst had brought eSoft's stock down to levels that resulted in its delisting from the NASDAQ SmallCap market and the stock moved to Over The Counter exchanges.

In the meantime, eSoft announced new lines of products including the InstaGate all-in-one appliance, which today is called a Unified Threat Management (UTM) appliance, but at the time was one of the first turnkey solutions of its kind. eSoft also introduced its InstaGate Secure Content Management line of appliances, which didn't include firewall and VPN functionality, and was later rebranded as ThreatWall. eSoft's all-in-one approach was provided a la carte to the appliance as subscription-based "SoftPaks" for different bits of functionality. Functionality included technologies like Gateway Anti-Virus, which at the time was licensed from Sophos. The software subscription model was fairly new when eSoft started that approach and eSoft was able to patent the concept of managing software subscriptions that include a la carte options and 3rd party technologies (U.S. Patent No. 6,961,773 B2). In 2006, eSoft stirred up controversy on the web after bringing patent infringement suits against competitors Astaro Corporation, Barracuda Networks, Blue Coat, Fortinet and SonicWALL.

eSoft's appliances are targeted at small businesses and claim to make complex security easy to manage for small and medium businesses with small or non-existent IT staffs. Around 2005, eSoft started bringing various technologies in-house rather than reselling other products. The culmination of this strategy resulted in March, 2008 when eSoft announced its OEM program for its SiteFilter secure web filtering technology. A year later, in April 2009, eSoft announced the signing of its 15th partner. In September 2010, the SiteFilter web filtering technology of eSoft was spun out as a separate company, Zvelo, and eSoft was taken private.
