= AAlib =

Software

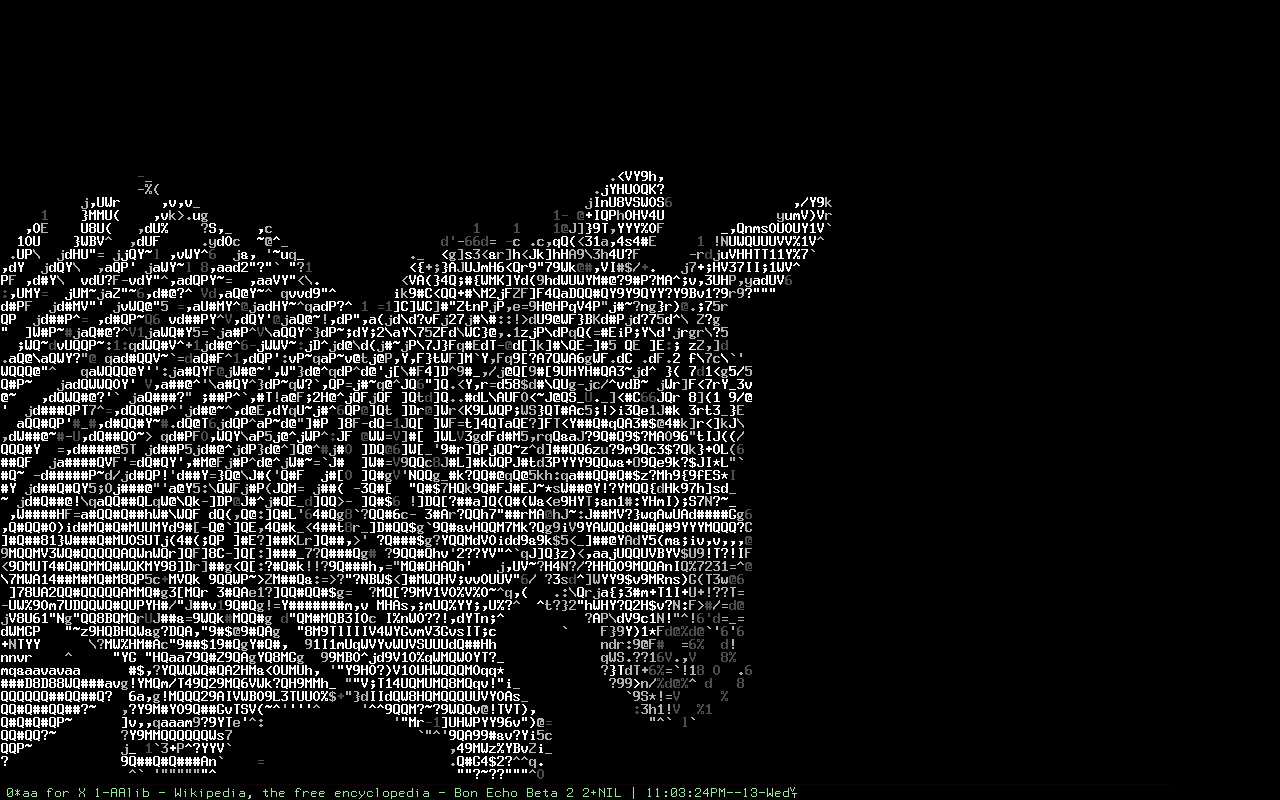
The AAlib demo program bb displaying a zebra

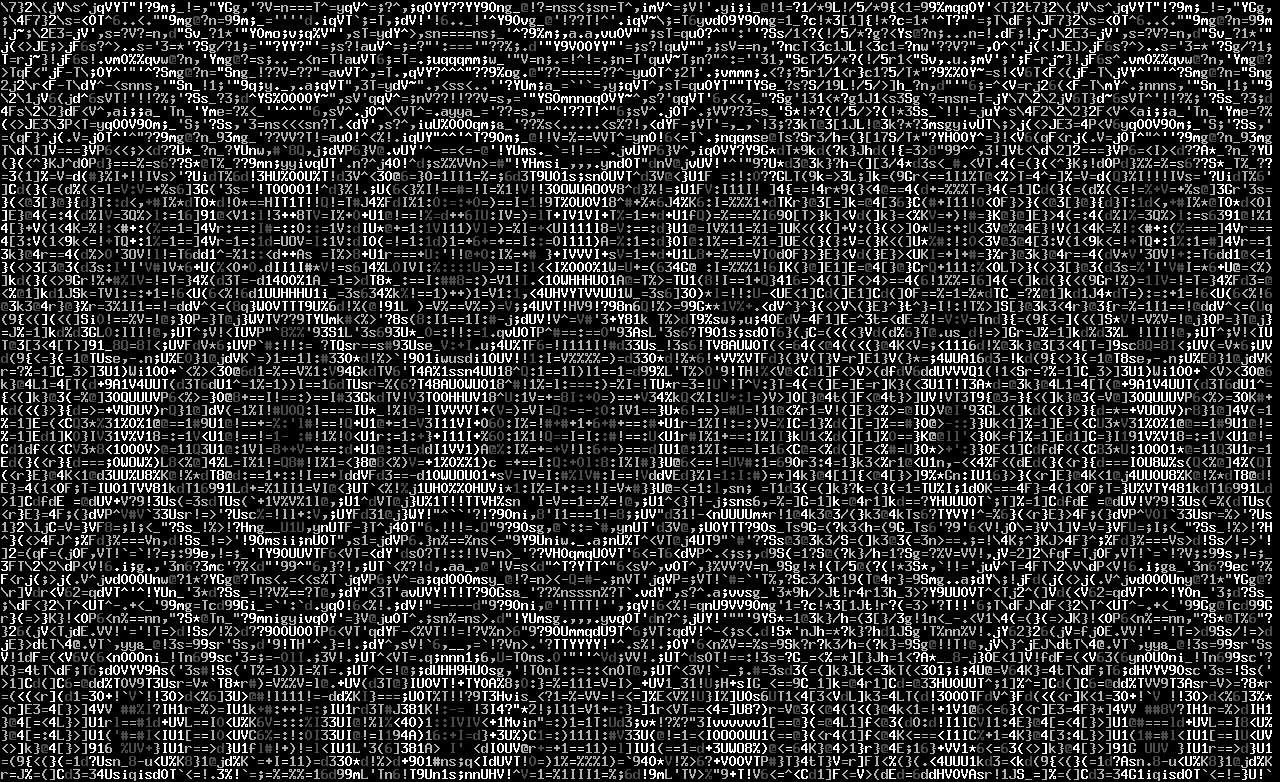
AAlib displaying a version of the plasma effect

AAlib is a software library which allows applications to automatically convert still and moving images into ASCII art. It was released by Jan Hubicka as part of the BBdemo project in 1997.

AAlib has been used in a wide variety of programs, including a conversion of Quake II which allows the 3D game to be played on dumb terminals, and to let media players output in text mode (Xine, MPlayer, VLC).

AAlib is freely distributed under the terms of the LGPLv2.

== See also ==
- libcaca
- ASCII art
