= Artpack =

An artpack is an archive of computer artwork which is distributed in a compressed format such as ZIP or RAR.

While most artpacks today contain either ANSI and ASCII art or hirez VGA, they may also include a combination of RIPscrip art, tracked or otherwise digital music, poetry and editorials, 3D computer animation and related software utilities.

The first artpack ever was The Acquisition, released by ACiD Productions in the early 1990s. Artpacks were originally released on a monthly basis by competing groups in the artscene, naming their files accordingly, i.e. ACDU0692.ZIP. Very few groups still carry on the tradition of monthly releases in this day, rather they opt to numbering their artpacks in sequence rather than by date, i.e. MIMIC50.ZIP, releasing their artpacks without any defined schedule.

In retrospect, artpacks are recognized as one of the primary reasons that the early computer art scene is so well preserved and documented in relation to other underground computer scenes at the time.
