= ICE Advertisements =

Canadian digital art group

Insane Creators Enterprise (iCE Advertisements)
- Formation: 1991
- Purpose: digital arts
- Headquarters: None (digital group)
- Key people: Many Axe (Frozen Tormentor)
- Website: http://www.ice.org/

iCE Advertisements (or more commonly and accurately simply "iCE") is a digital art group founded in Canada by Many Axe (later Frozen Tormentor) in 1991. Although the expanded title is rarely ever used, iCE is an acronym for Insane Creators Enterprise. iCE, along with ACiD Productions, was one of the most prominent and critically successful groups on the underground computer artscene.

== History ==
Artwork in high resolution VGA format

The group originally specialized in the creation of ANSI artwork for BBSes and MCGA graphics. During the BBS-era, their biggest competitor was ACiD Productions.

The ANSI artscene was in a continual state of flux, with intense rivalry between artists and groups. In addition, ANSI artists tended to switch loyalties often, moving from group to group. Groups would merge and restructure, or completely disband, but iCE was generally viewed by artscene regulars as one of the more stable groups. iCE was known to have particularly effective artistic leadership, and benefited from early artscene leaders such as Tempus Thales.

iCE, like their peers in the artscene, released artwork on a monthly basis in the form of an artpack. iCE released their first monthly artpack, referred to as an "iCEpack", in August 1992.

During the transition between BBS to the Internet, interest in iCE began to wane somewhat during the late 1990s. This was quickly reversed after the introduction of their well received Tiles collaborative art project in December 2000.

In 2006 iCE branched out into collaborative art, photography and digital art with members worldwide. Although iCE has continued to release monthly galleries of art, they abandoned the traditional artpack format after the release of their July 2002 artpack (dated August 6, 2002) in favor of an online presentation via their website.
