= Computer art scene =

Communities making art on computers

The computer art scene, or simply artscene, is the community interested and active in the creation of computer-based artwork.

== Early computer art ==
The history of computer art predates the computer art scene for several decades, with the first experiments having taken place in the early 1950s. Devices like plotters and teletypewriters were commonly used instead of video display screens. The earliest precursors to ASCII art can be found in RTTY art, that is, pictures created by amateur radio enthusiasts with teleprinters using the Baudot code.

In the early days of microcomputers, what could be shown on a typical video display screen was limited to plain and simple text, such as that found in the ASCII code set. In the early 1980s, users of IBM PC compatible computers began to experiment with ways of forming simple pictures and designs using only the 255 characters within the Extended ASCII character set, specifically known as code page 437, created by IBM. Modems and networking technology allowed computer users to communicate with each other over bulletin board systems (BBSes); the operators of these BBSes used ASCII art to enhance the aesthetic appearance of their systems. The common user interface or video mode shared by all systems was plain text. As a result, a "scene" of artists arose to fill the need for original art to distinguish one BBS from another.

== Evolving technology ==
=== At home ===
A 4,096 color Amiga picture

At a time when IBM PC compatibles were limited to monochrome graphics or the four preset colors of the Color Graphics Adapter, the Atari 8-bit computers had a palette of 128 colors and could display 4-8 of those at once—or many more with custom programming. The Commodore 64 could display 16 fixed colors.

In 1985, the Amiga arrived with the ability to display 640x480 4096-color graphics that could be exported via the NTSC standard. This capability was used by Disney animators in movies such as The Little Mermaid and by TV producers in shows such as SeaQuest and Babylon 5.

=== Online ===
As computer technology developed, the American National Standards Institute X3 committee invented a standard method of terminal control using escape sequences called "ANSI X3.64-1979". This protocol allowed for text and cursor positioning as well as defining foreground and background color attributes for the text.

Eventually, text artists began incorporating this new level of flexibility to the existing medium of ASCII art by adding color to their text-based art, or animating their art by manipulating the cursor control codes. This is what is commonly referred to today as "ANSI art" that is used in many scene nfos.

A decade later, the popularity of ANSI art had increased significantly (largely due to the similarly increasing interest in the BBS) and ANSI artists began to form into "groups", not unlike graffiti "crews." The first ANSI group was called Aces of ANSI Art (AAA). Though no official founding date can be established for this group, its earliest surviving tribute packs are dated December 1991 and includes art dated back to 1989.

Other groups like ACiD (ANSI Creators in Demand) and iCE (Insane Creators Enterprises) quickly began to spring up. Beginning in June 1992, these groups would release their work in monthly "ARTPACKS," which were collections of ASCII art submitted by the group's various members, as well as news and membership lists. These artpacks were then spread far and wide by BBS users. Some of the same groups from the 1990s still exist today; their art is now primarily distributed using the internet.

A later method of transmitting graphics over a BBS was developed called Remote Imaging Protocol or RIP, which required special software on both the BBS and the terminal end. RIP was still basically text, but the text referred to the positions of lines, curves, fills, and other steps in drawing graphics on an EGA display of 640x350x16 colors. While RIP never caught on in the BBS world, the art scene embraced it as a form of expression, if not a viable method of displaying art on a BBS.

== VGA to present day ==
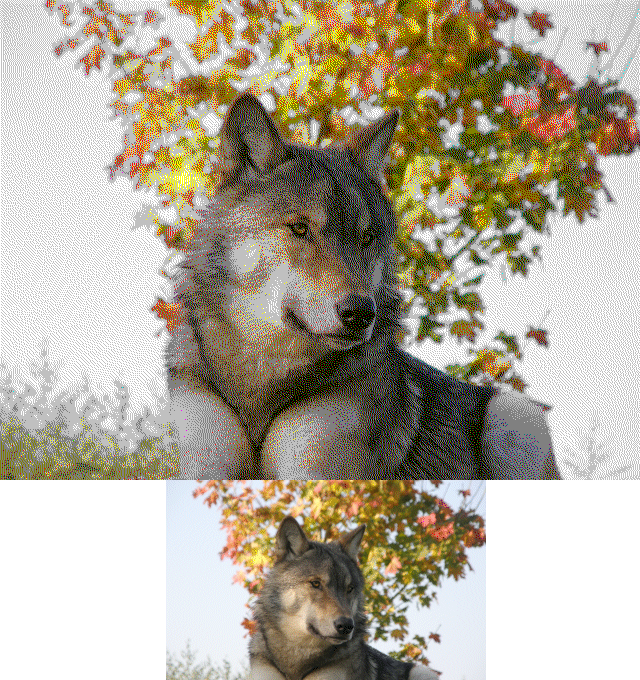
256 and 16 color progressive images from 1980s VGA card. Dithering is used to overcome color limitations.

In 1987 IBM introduced the VGA card. Early VGA graphics were "high resolution" images, generally using an 8-bit depth (256 colors) and a resolution of 320x200x256, 360x480x256 (hacked Mode X), or 640x480x16 colors. VGA was not intended to be displayed via a BBS and the vast majority of the early works in the IBM PC artscene were distributed as coded executables called "loaders" or "intros" rather than raw bitmap images. In fact, it was considered to be "lame" to release an uncoded VGA work of art from the early- to mid-1990s, a sure indication that your group was not skilled enough to retain a worthy programmer.

The advent of custom image viewers developed by groups within the artscene, such as ACiD View and iCEView, began to shift the perception of how VGA art should be distributed and what the accepted practice should be. A coded VGA which did not take any of the advantages of being an executable, like special effects or music, became viewed as an impractical use of disk space—all of this in turn spawned a number of competing image viewers, and even "Viewer Wars" between rival art groups. Talented underground artists such as CatBones continued to help pioneer and define what is now referred to as the "hirez artscene", further championing the move away from coded VGA to stand-alone imagery with his impressive artwork. Hirez today implies higher resolutions than before, such as a 1024x768 pixel canvas or larger, greater depth of color, and is created with much more sophisticated and modern software.

== Underground status ==
Despite the fact that contributors to the artscene can be found worldwide, the scene remains detached from mainstream bbs and internet culture. This can be seen as a result of the artscene's early affiliations with hacker and software piracy (warez) organizations. As early demoscene groups were organized by cracktros coders, artscene members were often found designing the .nfo files detailing warez releases. In addition much of the ansi art provided for warez BBSes was drawn by future members of the artscene. Prior to the popularity of the internet in the 1990s, the most efficient way to distribute software and files across BBSes was via a courier system. Both the warez scene and the artscene utilized this system, and in many cases warez couriers could be found distributing monthly artpacks.

In addition to connection that the various underground groups had, a common attitude and relationship between scene members developed. The general belief that "newbies are lame" and "veterans are elite", as well as the use of leetspeek, created an environment that was sometimes difficult for new members to enter. In particular, many artsceners' distrust and bitterness towards new America Online users in the 1990s may have eroded the possibility for a wider membership base and audience for the artscene.

== See also ==
- ANSI art
- ASCII art
- Pixel art
- Netart
- Digital art
- Software art
- Demoscene
- DeviantArt
- List of artscene groups
- Minor artscene groups

== Bibliography ==
- Danet, Brenda. "Cyberpl@y: Communicating Online". Oxford, UK: Berg Publishers, 2001. ISBN 1-85973-424-3.
- "Dark Domain: the artpacks.acid.org collection" (DVD-ROM). San Jose, CA, USA: ACiD Productions, LLC, 2004. ISBN 0-9746537-0-5.
- Scott, Jason. "BBS: The Documentary" (DVD). Boston, MA, USA: Bovine Ignition Systems, 2005.
- Zetter, Kim. "How Humble BBS Begat Wired World". Wired News. June 8, 2005. Retrieved October 27, 2005.
- Wands, Bruce (2006). Art of the Digital Age, London: Thames & Hudson. ISBN 0-500-23817-0.
