= ACiD Productions =

Digital art group founded in 1990

- Formation: 1 September 1990; 36 years ago
- Headquarters: United States
- Products: ACiD View; ACiDDraw; Empathy; PabloDraw; SAUCE; XBin; ACiDnews; ACiD Radio
- Leader: RaD Man
- Key people: RaD Man; Shadow Demon; Grimm; The Beholder; Phantom; Skaboy
- Affiliations: Remorse ASCII pHluid
- Website: acid.org

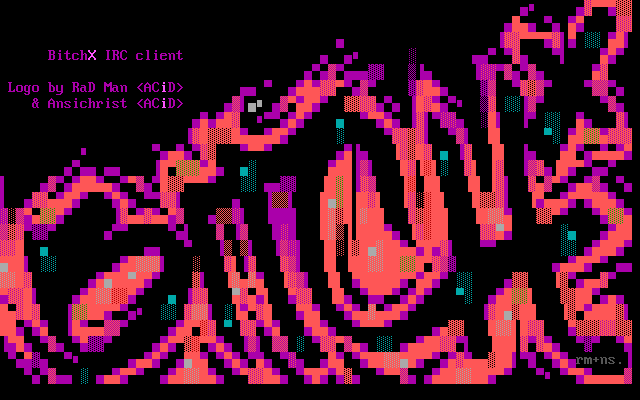
BitchX ANSI splash screen logo by RaD Man and Ansichrist (ACiD)

ACiD Productions (ACiD) is a digital art group. Founded in 1990, the group originally specialized in ANSI artwork for bulletin board systems (BBS). More recently, they have extended their reach into other graphical media and computer software development. During the BBS-era, their biggest competitor was iCE Advertisements.

== History ==
ACiD Productions was founded in 1990 as ANSI Creators in Demand by five members: RaD Man, Shadow Demon, Grimm, The Beholder, and Phantom. Their work originally concentrated in ANSI and ASCII art, but the group later branched out into other artistic media such as tracker music, demo coding, and multimedia software development (e.g., image viewers). Membership rose from five members in 1990 to well over seven hundred by 2003.

In the mid-1990s, ACiD created subsidiary groups responsible for these broader areas. For example, Remorse is the official ACiD sub-label responsible for ASCII art and other text-based graphics. Similarly, pHluid is responsible for module tracking and music production, and ACiDic handles bulletin board software modification and enhancement.

Following the post dial-up BBS era, ACiD focused largely on the preservation of digital art history, talk radio news, the sale of their DVD-based artscene archives, and sponsorship of demoparties.

In 2008, the San Francisco gallery 20 GOTO 10 featured an exhibit of ACiD artists Somms and Lord Jazz.

In 2013, members from ACiD collaborated with 21st century ANSI art collective Blocktronics to produce "Blocktronics ACiD Trip", a scrolling ANSI measuring 3266 lines tall. This ANSI artwork debuted at Demosplash at Carnegie Mellon University where it was awarded first place in the ANSI and ASCII category.

== Works ==
ACiD has produced a variety of well-received works and services. A select list follows:

=== Demos ===
- "Out of Sight, Out of Mind"

=== Image viewers ===
- ACiD View
- SimpleXB
- RemorseView

=== Image editors ===
- ACiDDraw
- Empathy
- PabloDraw

=== Metadata protocols and binary image standard ===
- Standard Architecture for Universal Comment Extensions (SAUCE)
- XBin

=== Music disks ===
- pHluid

=== Disk magazines ===
- The Product
- Lancelot II
- ACiDnews

=== Radio programming ===
- The ARTS (news/talk radio)
- pHluid Radio (music)
- ACiD Radio (music)

== See also ==
- Aces of ANSI Art (<A.A.A>)
- ANSI art
- ASCII art
- List of artscene groups
- List of text editors (ASCII art section)
