= ASCII art =

Computer art form using text characters

ASCII art of a fish

ASCII art is a graphic design technique that uses computers for presentation and consists of pictures pieced together from the 95 printable (from a total of 128) characters defined by the ASCII Standard from 1963 and ASCII compliant character sets with proprietary extended characters (beyond the 128 characters of standard 7-bit ASCII). The term is also loosely used to refer to text-based visual art in general. ASCII art can be created with any text editor, and is often used with free-form languages. Most examples of ASCII art require a fixed-width font (non-proportional fonts, as on a traditional typewriter) such as Courier or Consolas for presentation.

Among the oldest known examples of ASCII art are the creations by computer-art pioneer Kenneth Knowlton from around 1966, who was working for Bell Labs at the time. "Studies in Perception I" by Knowlton and Leon Harmon from 1966 shows some examples of their early ASCII art.

ASCII art was invented, in large part, because early printers often lacked graphics ability and thus, characters were used in place of graphic marks. Also, to mark divisions between different print jobs from different users, bulk printers often used ASCII art to print large banner pages, making the division easier to spot so that the results could be more easily separated by a computer operator or clerk. ASCII art was also used in early e-mail when images could not be embedded.

== History ==
=== Typewriter art ===
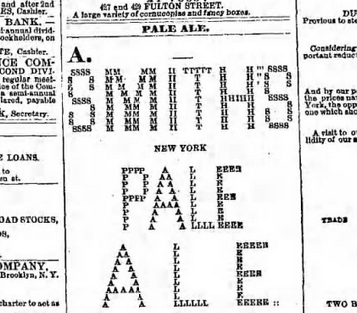
"Typewriter art" advertisement in the Brooklyn Daily Eagle, 6 January 1875

Since 1867, typewriters have been used for creating visual art. Typists could find guides in books or magazines with instructions on how to type portraits or other depictions.

=== TTY and RTTY ===
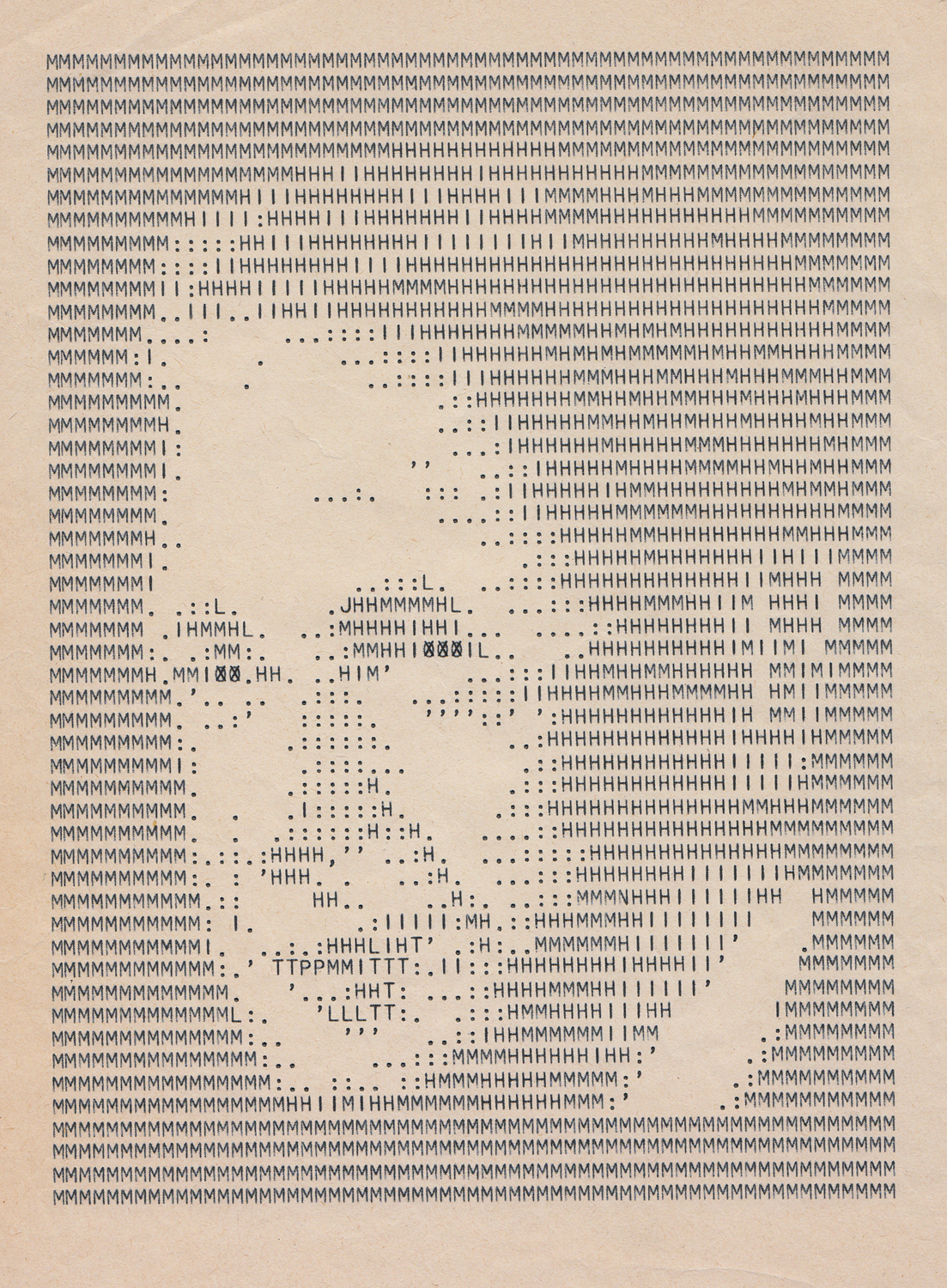
Dag Hammarskjöld, printout from teleprinter 1961–1962

TTY stands for "TeleTYpe" or "TeleTYpewriter", and is also known as Teleprinter or Teletype. RTTY stands for Radioteletype; character sets such as Baudot code, which predated ASCII (the American Standard Code for Information Interchange), were used. According to a chapter in the "RTTY Handbook", text images were sent via teletypewriter as early as 1923. However, none of the "old" RTTY art has been discovered yet. What is known is that text images appeared frequently on radioteletype in the 1960s and the 1970s.

=== Line-printer art ===
In the 1960s, Andries van Dam published a representation of an electronic circuit produced on an IBM 1403 line printer. At the same time, Kenneth Knowlton was producing realistic images, also on line printers, by overprinting several characters on top of one another. Note that it was not ASCII art in a sense that the 1403 was driven by an EBCDIC-coded platform and the character sets and trains available on the 1403 were derived from EBCDIC rather than ASCII, despite some glyphs commonalities.

=== ASCII art ===
There are 95 printable ASCII characters, numbered 32 to 126.

The widespread usage of ASCII art can be traced to the computer bulletin board systems of the late 1970s and early 1980s. The limitations of computers of that time period necessitated the use of text characters to represent images. Along with ASCII's use in communication, however, it also began to appear in the underground online art groups of the period.

An ASCII comic is a form of webcomic which uses ASCII text to create images. In place of images in a regular comic, ASCII art is used, with the text or dialog usually placed underneath.

During the 1990s, graphical browsing and variable-width fonts became increasingly popular, leading to a decline in ASCII art. Despite this, ASCII art continued to survive through online MUDs, an acronym for "Multi-User Dungeon", (which are textual multiplayer role-playing video games), Internet Relay Chat, Email, message boards, and other forms of online communication which commonly employ the needed fixed-width.

ASCII art is seen to this day on the CLI app Neofetch, which displays the logo of the OS on which it is invoked.

Joan Stark is an American prolific ASCII artist who was active on Usenet's alt.ascii.art in the mid 1990s. Her involvement in ASCII art has been taken as an example of increased online participation by women.

=== ANSI ===
ASCII and more importantly, ANSI were staples of the early technological era; terminal systems relied on coherent presentation using color and control signals standard in the terminal protocols.

Over the years, warez groups began to enter the ASCII art scene. Warez groups usually release .nfo files with their software, cracks or other general software reverse-engineering releases. The ASCII art will usually include the warez group's name and maybe some ASCII borders on the outsides of the release notes, etc.

== Uses ==
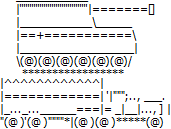
A self-propelled howitzer and truck made using ASCII art

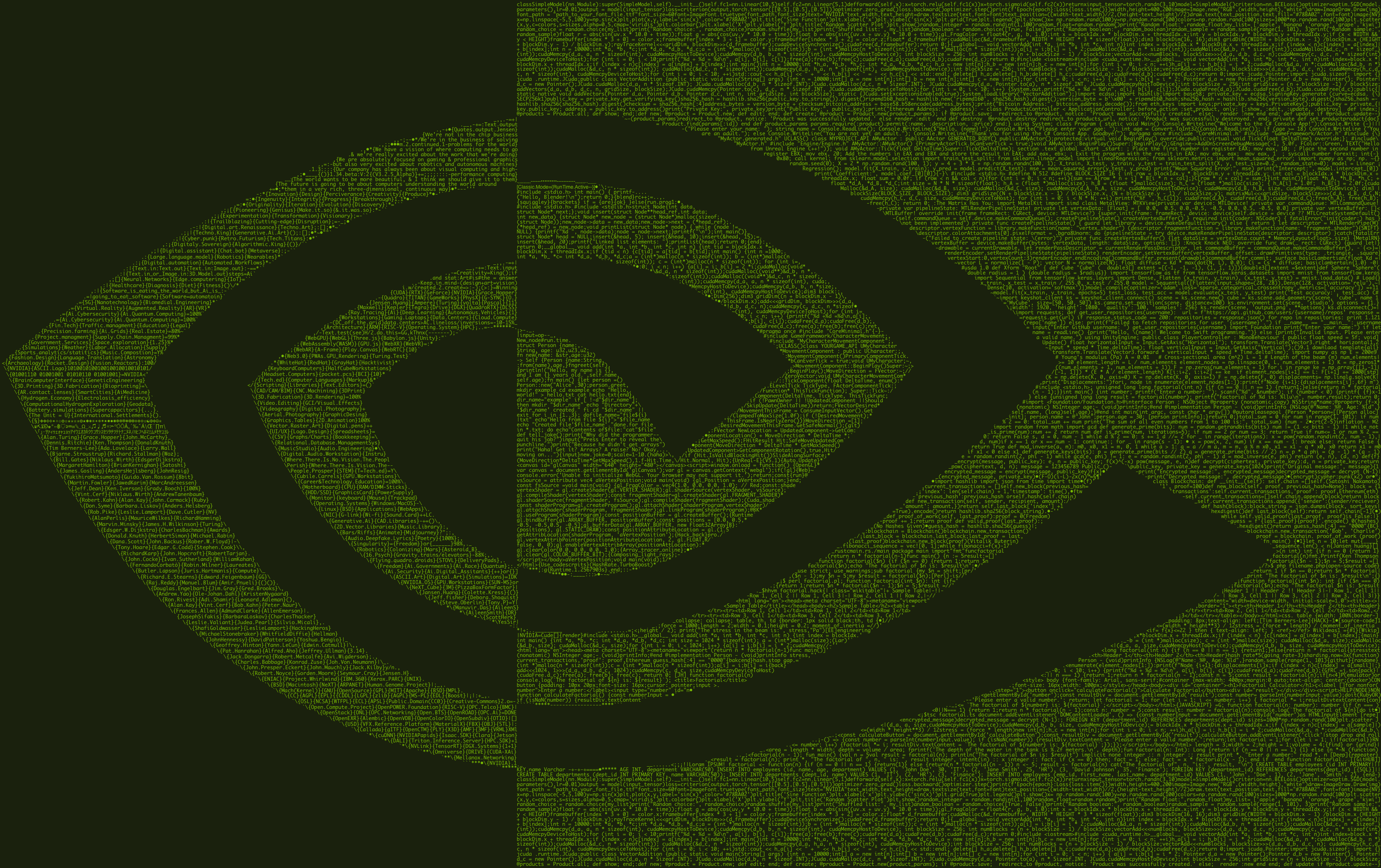
Nvidia ASCII logo

ASCII art is used wherever text can be more readily printed or transmitted than graphics, or in some cases, where the transmission of pictures is not possible. This includes typewriters, teleprinters, non-graphic computer terminals, printer separators, in early computer networking (e.g., BBSes), email, and Usenet news messages. ASCII art is also used within the source code of computer programs for representation of company or product logos, and flow control or other diagrams. In some cases, the entire source code of a program is a piece of ASCII art – for instance, an entry to one of the earlier International Obfuscated C Code Contest is a program that adds numbers, but visually looks like a binary adder drawn in logic ports.

Some electronic schematic archives represent the circuits using ASCII art. (Note: Attributed to multiple sources:)

Examples of ASCII-style art predating the modern computer era can be found in the June 1939, July 1948 and October 1948 editions of Popular Mechanics.

Early mainframe games played on terminals frequently used ASCII art to simulate graphics, most notably the roguelike genre using ASCII art to visually represent dungeons and monsters within them. The Kroz series of roguelikes for MS-DOS uses ASCII art. 0verkill is a 2D platform multiplayer shooter game designed entirely in color ASCII art.

MPlayer and VLC media player can display videos as ASCII art through the AAlib library.

Many game walkthrough guides come as part of a basic .txt file; this file often contains the name of the game in ASCII art.

== Types and styles ==
Different techniques could be used in ASCII art to obtain different artistic effects.

"Typewriter-style" lettering, made from individual letter characters:

H   H EEEEE L     L      OOO       W   W  OOO  RRRR  L     DDDD  !!
H   H E     L     L     O   O      W W W O   O R   R L     D   D !! 
HHHHH EEEEE L     L     O   O      W W W O   O RRRR  L     D   D !! 
H   H E     L     L     O   O  ,,   W W  O   O R   R L     D   D    
H   H EEEEE LLLLL LLLLL  OOO  ,,    W W   OOO  R   R LLLLL DDDD  !!

Line art, for creating shapes:

.--.     /\                ____
'--'    /__\    (^._.^)~ <(o.o )>

Solid art, for creating filled objects:

.g@8g.  db
'Y8@P' d88b

Shading, using symbols with various intensities for creating gradients or contrasts:

:$#$: "4b. ':.
:$#$:   "4b. ':.

Combinations of the above, often used as signatures, for example, at the end of an email:

  |\_/|        ****************************    (\_/)
 / @ @ \       *  "Purrrfectly pleasant"  *   (='.'=)
( > º < )      *       Poppy Prinz        *   (")_(")
 `>>x<<´       *   (pprinz@example.com)   *
 /  O  \       ****************************

As-pixel characters use combinations of ░ , █ , ▄, ▀ (Block Elements), and/or ⣿, ⣴, ⢁, etc (Braille ASCII) to make pictures:

⣿⣿⣿⣿⣿⣿⣿⣿⣿⣿⣿⣿⣿⣿⣿⣿⣿⣿⣿⠿⠿⠿⠿⢿⣿⣿⣿⣿⣿⣿
⣿⣿⣿⣿⣿⣿⣿⣿⣿⣿⣿⣿⣿⣿⣿⣿⣿⠟⢁⣴⣾⣿⣷⣦⣌⠙⢿⣿⣿⣿
⣿⣿⣿⣿⣿⣿⣿⣿⣿⣿⣿⣿⣿⣿⣿⠟⢁⣴⣿⣿⣿⣿⣿⣿⣿⣷⡈⢻⣿⣿
⣿⣿⣿⣿⣿⣿⣿⣿⣿⣿⣿⣿⣿⠟⢁⣴⣿⣿⠟⠋⣉⠙⢻⣿⣿⣿⣷⠀⣿⣿
⣿⣿⣿⣿⣿⣿⣿⣿⣿⣿⣿⠟⢁⣴⣿⣿⠟⢁⣴⣿⣿⡷⢀⣿⣿⣿⡿⠀⣿⣿
⣿⣿⣿⣿⣿⣿⣿⣿⣿⠟⢁⣴⣿⣿⠟⢁⣴⣿⣿⡿⠋⣠⣾⣿⣿⠟⢁⣼⣿⣿
⣿⣿⣿⣿⣿⣿⣿⠟⢁⣴⣿⣿⠟⢁⣴⣿⣿⡿⠋⣠⣾⣿⣿⠟⢁⣴⣿⣿⣿⣿
⣿⣿⣿⣿⣿⠟⢁⣴⣿⣿⠟⢁⣴⣿⣿⡿⠋⣠⣾⣿⣿⠟⢁⣴⣿⣿⣿⣿⣿⣿
⣿⣿⣿⠟⢁⣴⣿⣿⣿⣿⣶⣿⣿⡿⠋⣠⣾⣿⣿⠟⢁⣴⣿⣿⣿⣿⣿⣿⣿⣿
⣿⣿⠁⣴⣿⣿⣿⣿⣿⣿⣿⡿⠋⣠⣾⣿⣿⠟⢁⣴⣿⣿⣿⣿⣿⣿⣿⣿⣿⣿
⣿⣿⠀⢿⣿⣿⣿⣿⣿⡿⠋⣠⣾⣿⣿⠟⢁⣴⣿⣿⣿⣿⣿⣿⣿⣿⣿⣿⣿⣿
⣿⣿⣧⡈⠻⢿⣿⡿⠋⣠⣾⣿⣿⡟⢁⣴⣿⣿⣿⣿⣿⣿⣿⣿⣿⣿⣿⣿⣿⣿
⣿⣿⣿⣿⣷⣶⣶⣶⣿⣿⣿⣿⣿⣿⣿⣿⣿⣿⣿⣿⣿⣿⣿⣿⣿⣿⣿⣿⣿⣿

=== Emoticons ===
The simplest forms of ASCII art are combinations of two or three characters for expressing emotion in text. They are commonly referred to as 'emoticon', 'smilie', or 'smiley'. There is another type of one-line ASCII art that does not require the mental rotation of pictures, which is widely known in Japan as kaomoji (literally "face characters").

More complex examples use several lines of text to draw large symbols or more complex figures. Hundreds of different text smileys have developed over time, but only a few are generally accepted, used and understood.

=== ASCII comic ===
An ASCII comic is a form of webcomic.

==== The Adventures of Nerd Boy ====
'The Adventures of Nerd Boy', or just 'Nerd Boy', was an ASCII comic, published by Joaquim Gândara between 5 August 2001 and 17 July 2007, and consisting of 600 strips. They were posted to ASCII art newsgroup alt.ascii-art and on the website. Some strips have been translated to Polish and French.

=== Styles of the computer underground text art scene ===
==== Atari 400/800 ATASCII ====
The Atari 400/800, which were released in 1979, did not follow the ASCII standard and had their own character set, called ATASCII. The emergence of ATASCII art coincided with the growing popularity of BBS Systems caused by availability of the acoustic couplers that were compatible with the 8-bit home computers. ATASCII text animations are also referred to as "break animations" by the Atari sceners.

==== C-64 PETSCII ====
The Commodore 64, which was released in 1982, also did not follow the ASCII standard. The C-64 character set is called PETSCII, an extended form of ASCII-1963. As with the Atari's ATASCII art, C-64 fans developed a similar scene that used PETSCII for their creations.

==== "Block ASCII" / "High ASCII" style ASCII art on the IBM PC ====
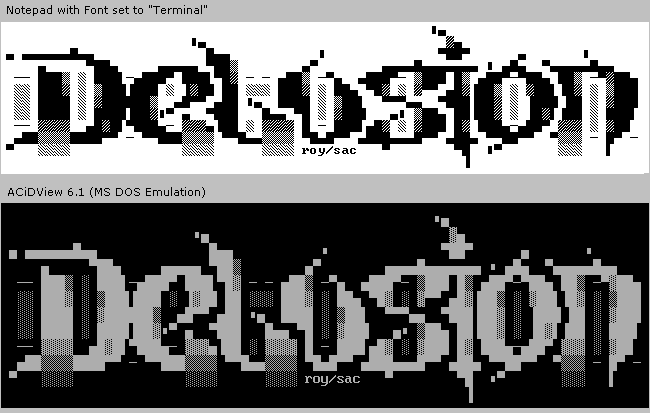
Block ASCII display via Notepad versus ACiDView for Windows

So-called "block ASCII" or "high ASCII" uses the extended characters of the 8-bit code page 437, which is a proprietary standard introduced by IBM in 1979 (ANSI Standard x3.16) for the IBM PC DOS and MS-DOS operating systems. "Block ASCIIs" were widely used on the PC during the 1990s until the Internet replaced BBSes as the main communication platform. Until then, "block ASCIIs" dominated the PC Text Art Scene.

The first art scene group that focused on the extended character set of the PC in their artwork was called "Aces of ANSI Art", or <A.A.A>. Some members left in 1990 and formed a group called "ANSI Creators in Demand", or ACiD. In that same year the second major underground art scene group "Insane Creators Enterprise", or ICE, was founded.

There is some debate between ASCII and block ASCII artists, with "Hardcore" ASCII artists maintaining that block ASCII art is in fact not ASCII art, because it does not use the 128 characters of the original ASCII standard. On the other hand, block ASCII artists argue that if their art uses only characters of the computer's character set, then it is to be called ASCII, regardless if the character set is proprietary or not.

Microsoft Windows does not support the ANSI Standard x3.16. One can view block ASCIIs with a text editor using the font "Terminal", but it will not look exactly as it was intended by the artist. With a special ASCII/ANSI viewer, such as ACiDView for Windows, one can see block ASCII and ANSI files properly. An example that illustrates the difference in appearance is part of this article. Alternatively, one could look at the file using the TYPE command in the command prompt.

==== "Amiga"/"Oldskool" style ASCII art ====
Oldschool/Amiga ASCII look on Commodore Amiga computer showing noticeably tighter spacing than on the IBM PC

In the art scene one popular ASCII style that used the 7-bit standard ASCII character set was the so-called "Oldskool" style. It is also called "Amiga style", due to its origin and widespread use on Commodore Amiga computers. The style uses primarily the characters _/\-+=.()<>: and looks more like the outlined drawings of shapes than real pictures. The accompanying image is an example of "Amiga style" (also referred to as "old school" or "oldskool" style) scene ASCII art.

The Amiga ASCII scene surfaced in 1992, seven years after the introduction of the Commodore Amiga 1000. The Commodore 64 PETSCII scene did not make the transition to the Commodore Amiga as the C64 demo and warez scenes did. Among the first Amiga ASCII art groups were ART, Epsilon Design, Upper Class, Unreal (later known as "DeZign"). This means that the text art scene on the Amiga was actually younger than the text art scene on the PC. The Amiga artists also did not call their ASCII art style "Oldskool". That term was introduced on the PC; when and by whom is unknown and lost to history.

The Amiga style ASCII artwork was most often released in the form of a single text file, which included all the artwork (usually requested), with some design parts in between, as opposed to the PC art scene where the art work was released as a ZIP archive with separate text files for each piece. Furthermore, the releases were usually called "ASCII collections" and not "art packs" like on the IBM PC.

===== In text editors =====
 _____ ___ ____ _      _   
|  ___|_ _/ ___| | ___| |_ 
| |_   | | |  _| |/ _ \ __|
|  _|  | | |_| | |  __/ |_ 
|_|   |___\____|_|\___|\__|

This kind of ASCII art is handmade in a text editor. Popular editors used to make this kind of ASCII art include Windows Notepad, CygnusEditor also known as CED (Amiga), and EditPlus2 (PC).

The accompanying image shows an Oldskool font example done with the ASCII editor FIGlet on a PC.

==== Newskool style ASCII art ====
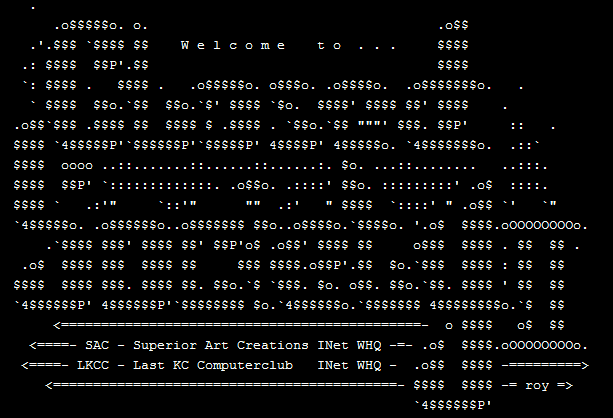
Newskool ASCII screenshot

"Newskool" is a popular form of ASCII art which capitalizes on character strings like "$#Xxo". In spite of its name, the style is not "new"; on the contrary, it was very old but fell out of favor and was replaced by "Oldskool" and "Block" style ASCII art. It was dubbed "Newskool" upon its comeback and renewed popularity at the end of the 1990s.

Newskool changed significantly as the result of the introduction of extended proprietary characters. The classic 7-bit standard ASCII characters remain predominant, but the extended characters are often used for "fine tuning" and "tweaking". The style developed further after the introduction and adaptation of Unicode.

== Methods for generating ASCII art ==
While some prefer to use a simple text editor to produce ASCII art, specialized programs, such as JavE have been developed that often simulate the features and tools in bitmap image editors. For Block ASCII art and ANSI art the artist almost always uses a special text editor, because to generate the required characters on a standard keyboard, one needs to know the Alt code for each character. For example, Alt+178 will produce ▓, Alt+177 will produce ▒, and Alt+8 will produce ◘.

The special text editors have sets of special characters assigned to existing keys on the keyboard. Popular editors for MS-DOS, such as TheDraw and ACiDDraw have multiple sets of different special characters mapped to the function keys to make the use of those characters easier for the artist who can switch between individual sets of characters via basic keyboard shortcuts. PabloDraw is one of the very few special ASCII/ANSI art editors developed for Windows.

=== Image to text conversion ===
Other programs allow one to automatically convert an image to text characters, which is a special case of vector quantization. A method is to sample the image down to grayscale with less than 8-bit precision, and then assign a character for each value. Such ASCII art generators often allow users to choose the intensity and contrast of the generated image.

Three factors limit the fidelity of the conversion, especially of photographs:

- depth (solutions: reduced line spacing; bold style; block elements; colored background; good shading);
- sharpness (solutions: a longer text, with a smaller font; a greater set of characters; variable width fonts);
- ratio (solutions with compatibility issues: font with a square grid; stylized without extra line spacing).

Examples of converted images are given below.

This is one of the earliest forms of ASCII art, dating back to the early days of the 1960s minicomputers and teletypes. During the 1970s, it was popular in US malls to get a t-shirt with a photograph printed in ASCII art on it from an automated kiosk containing a computer, and London's Science Museum had a similar service to produce printed portraits. With the advent of the web, HTML and CSS, many ASCII conversion programs will now quantize to a full RGB colorspace, enabling colorized ASCII images.

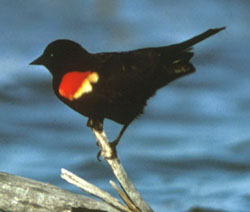

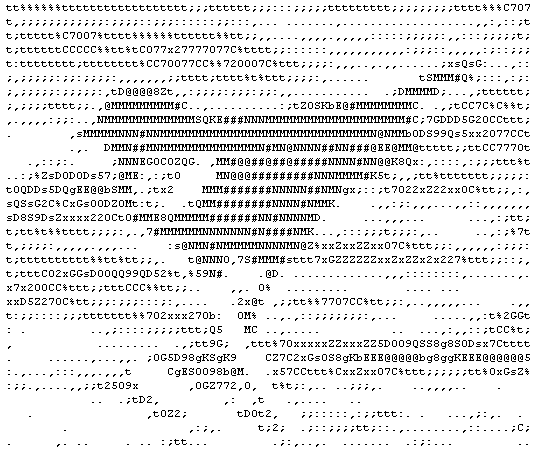

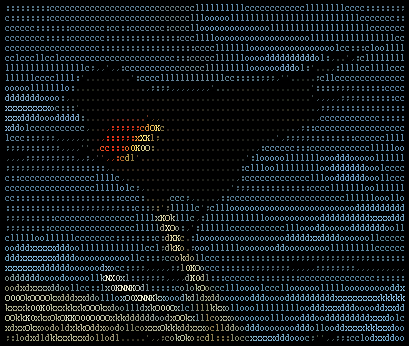

Still images or movies can also be converted to ASCII on various UNIX and UNIX-like systems using the AAlib (black and white) or libcaca (colour) graphics device driver, or the VLC media player or mpv under Windows, Linux or macOS; all of which render the screen using ASCII symbols instead of pixels.

There are also a number of smartphone applications, such as ASCII cam for Android, that generate ASCII art in real-time using input from the phone's camera. These applications typically allow the ASCII art to be saved as either a text file or as an image made up of ASCII text.

== Non fixed-width ASCII ==
Most ASCII art is created using a monospaced font, such as Courier, where all characters are identical in width. Early computers in use when ASCII art came into vogue had monospaced fonts for screen and printer displays. Today, most of the more commonly used fonts in word processors, web browsers and other programs are proportional fonts, such as Helvetica or Times New Roman, where different widths are used for different characters. ASCII art drawn for a fixed width font will usually appear distorted, or even unrecognizable when displayed in a proportional font.

Some ASCII artists (Note: (for instance, see the works of Andrew Hurle)) have produced art for display in proportional fonts. These ASCIIs, rather than using a purely shade-based correspondence, use characters for slopes and borders and use block shading. These ASCIIs generally offer greater precision and attention to detail than fixed-width ASCIIs for a lower character count, although they are not as universally accessible since they are usually relatively font-specific.

== Animated ASCII art ==
Animated ASCII art started in 1970 from so-called VT100 animations produced on VT100 terminals. These animations were simply text with cursor movement instructions, deleting and erasing the characters necessary to appear animated. Usually, they represented a long hand-crafted process undertaken by a single person to tell a story.

Contemporary web browser revitalized animated ASCII art again. It became possible to display animated ASCII art via JavaScript or Java applets. Static ASCII art pictures are loaded and displayed one after another, creating the animation, very similar to how movie projectors unreel film reel and project the individual pictures on the big screen at movie theaters. A new term was born: "ASCIImation" – another name of animated ASCII art. A seminal work in this arena is the Star Wars ASCIImation. More complicated routines in JavaScript generate more elaborate ASCIImations showing effects like Morphing effects, star field emulations, fading effects and calculated images, such as mandelbrot fractal animations.

There are now many tools and programs that can transform raster images into text symbols; some of these tools can operate on streaming video. For example, the music video for American singer Beck's song "Black Tambourine" is made up entirely of ASCII characters that approximate the original footage. VLC, a media player software, can render any video in colored ASCII through the libcaca module.

== Other text-based visual art ==
There are a variety of other types of art using text symbols from character sets other than ASCII and/or some form of color coding. Despite not being pure ASCII, these are still often referred to as "ASCII art". The character set portion designed specifically for drawing is known as the line drawing characters or pseudo-graphics.

=== ANSI art ===
The IBM PC graphics hardware in text mode uses 16 bits per character. It supports a variety of configurations, but in its default mode under DOS they are used to give 256 glyphs from one of the IBM PC code pages (Code page 437 by default), 16 foreground colors, eight background colors, and a flash option. Such art can be loaded into screen memory directly. ANSI.SYS, if loaded, also allows such art to be placed on screen by outputting escape sequences that indicate movements of the screen cursor and color/flash changes. If this method is used then the art becomes known as ANSI art. The IBM PC code pages also include characters intended for simple drawing which often made this art appear much cleaner than that made with more traditional character sets. Plain text files are also seen with these characters, though they have become far less common since Windows GUI text editors (using the Windows ANSI code page) have largely replaced DOS-based ones.

=== Shift_JIS and Japan ===
Monā (モナー) Posted on 2channel (２ちゃんねる, Nichanneru) in 2000

Giko cat (ギコ猫, Gikoneko) Posted on 2channel in 2000

In Japan, ASCII art (AA) is mainly known as Shift_JIS art. Shift JIS offers a larger selection of characters than plain ASCII (including characters from Japanese scripts and fullwidth forms of ASCII characters), and may be used for text-based art on Japanese websites.

Often, such artwork is designed to be viewed with the default Japanese font on a platform, such as the proportional MS P Gothic.

==== Kaomoji ====
Users on ASCII-NET, in which the word ASCII refers to the ASCII Corporation rather than the American Standard Code for Information Interchange, popularised a style of emoticon (顔文字, kaomoji; emoticon) in which the face appears upright rather than rotated.

Icon	Meaning
(^_^) (^^ゞ (^_^;) (-_-;) (~_~;) (・。・;) (・_・;) (・・;) ^^; ^_^; (#^.^#) (^ ^;)	Smiley, nervous, embarrassed, troubled, shy, sweat drop

=== Unicode ===
Unicode would seem to offer the ultimate flexibility in producing text based art with its huge variety of characters. However, finding a suitable fixed-width font is likely to be difficult if a significant subset of Unicode is desired. (Modern UNIX-style operating systems do provide complete fixed-width Unicode fonts, e.g. for xterm. Windows has the Courier New font, which includes characters like ┌ ╥ ─ ╨ ┐♥ ☺ Ƹ̵̡ Ӝ̵̨̄ Ʒ). Also, the common practice of rendering Unicode with a mixture of variable width fonts is likely to make predictable display hard, if more than a tiny subset of Unicode is used. ≽^{ʌ}ⱷ҅_{ᴥ}ⱷ^{ʌ}≼ is an adequate representation of a cat's face in a font with varying character widths.

==== Control and combining characters ====
The combining characters mechanism of Unicode provides considerable ways of customizing the style, even obfuscating the text (e.g. via an online generator like Obfuscator, which focuses on the filters). 'Glitcher' is one example of Unicode art, initiated in 2012: "These symbols, intruding up and down, are made by combining lots of diacritical marks. It's a kind of art. There's quite a lot of artists who use the Internet or specific social networks as their canvas." The corresponding creations are favored in web browsers (thanks to their always better support), as geekily stylized usernames for social networks. With a fair compatibility, and among different online tools, Facebook symbols showcases various types of Unicode art, mainly for aesthetic purpose (Ɯıḳĭƥḙȡḯả Wîkipêȡıẚ Ẉǐḳîṗȅḍȉā Ẃįḵįṗẻḑìẵ Ẉĭḵɪṕḗdïą Ẇïƙỉpểɗĭà Ẅȉḱïṕȩđĩẵ etc.). Besides, the creations can be hand-crafted (by programming), or pasted from mobile applications. The underlying technique dates back to the old systems that incorporated control characters, though. E.g. the German composite ö would be imitated on ZX Spectrum by overwriting " after backspace and o.

=== Overprinting (surprint) ===
In the 1970s and early 1980s it was popular to produce a kind of text art that relied on overprinting. This could be produced either on a screen or on a printer by typing a character, backing up, and then typing another character, just as on a typewriter. This developed into sophisticated graphics in some cases, such as the PLATO system (circa 1973), where superscript and subscript allowed a wide variety of graphic effects. A common use was for emoticons, with WOBTAX and VICTORY both producing convincing smiley faces. Overprinting had previously been used on typewriters, but the low-resolution pixelation of characters on video terminals meant that overprinting here produced seamless pixel graphics, rather than visibly overstruck combinations of letters on paper.

Beyond pixel graphics, this was also used for printing photographs, as the overall darkness of a particular character space dependent on how many characters, as well as the choice of character, were printed in a particular place. Thanks to the increased granularity of tone, photographs were often converted to this type of printout. Even manual typewriters or daisy wheel printers could be used. The technique has fallen from popularity since all cheap printers can easily print photographs, and a normal text file (or an e-mail message or Usenet posting) cannot represent overprinted text. However, something similar has emerged to replace it: shaded or colored ASCII art, using ANSI video terminal markup or color codes (such as those found in HTML, IRC, and many internet message boards) to add a bit more tone variation. In this way, it is possible to create ASCII art where the characters only differ in color.

== See also ==
- Micrography
- Types and styles: Alt code, ASCII stereogram, box-drawing characters, emoticon, FILE_ID.DIZ, .nfo (release info file)
- Pre-ASCII history: Calligram, Concrete poetry, Typewriter, Typewriter mystery game, Teleprinter, Radioteletype
- Related art: ANSI art, ASCII porn, ATASCII, Fax art, PETSCII, Shift JIS art, Text semigraphics
- Related context: Bulletin board system (BBS), Computer art scene, Category:Artscene groups
- Software: AAlib, cowsay
- Unicode: Homoglyph, Duplicate characters in Unicode
- Pixel art
- Cross-stitch
