= ANSI art =

Computer art form using text characters

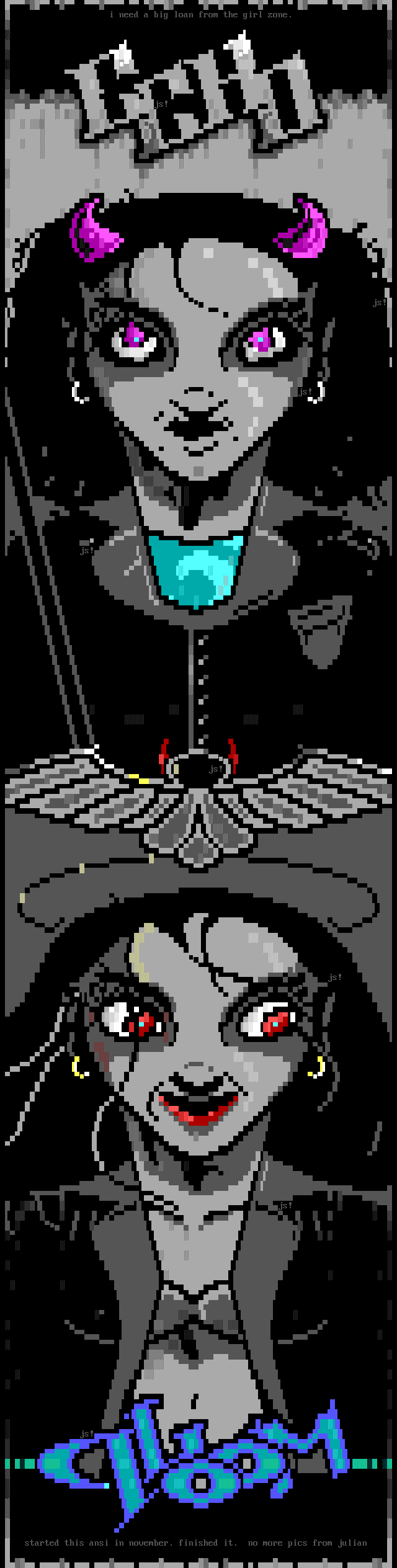
Example of long-form ANSI artwork

ANSI art is a form of text-mode computer art that became closely associated with dial-up bulletin board systems (BBSes), particularly during the early 1990s. It is related to ASCII art, but commonly uses the 8-bit IBM code page 437 character set, which includes box-drawing and block elements designed for character-cell graphics in addition to letters, numbers, and other symbols.

ANSI art also uses escape sequences to control display attributes such as colour and cursor position. Under MS-DOS, these sequences could be interpreted by the optional ANSI.SYS device driver. Cursor-control sequences can also be used to produce animated text-mode works, commonly known as ANSImations. ANSI art and text files containing ANSI escape sequences commonly use the .ANS filename extension.

== Overview ==
ANSI art is considerably more flexible than ASCII art, because the particular character set it uses contains symbols intended for drawing, such as a wide variety of box-drawing characters and block characters that dither the foreground and background color. It also adds accented characters and math symbols that often find creative use among ANSI artists.

The popularity of ANSI art encouraged the creation of a powerful shareware package called TheDraw coded by Ian E. Davis in 1986. Not only did it considerably simplify the process of making an ANSI art screen from scratch, but it also included a variety of "fonts", large letters constructed from box and block characters, and transition animations such as dissolve and clock. No new versions of TheDraw emerged after version 4.63 in 1993, but in later years a number of other ANSI editors appeared, some of which are still maintained today.

ZZT used IBM PC color text mode for its graphics. Its world files stored game boards as run-length-encoded tile data, with an element and color value for each run. MegaZeux, a later game creation system inspired by ZZT, also used character-based graphics but allowed users to edit the glyphs in its 256-character main character set.

Trade Wars 2002, a multiplayer BBS game that remains popular decades after its release, used ANSI graphics to depict ships, planets, and important locations, and included cutscenes and a cinema with ANSI animations. Many of these ANSI graphics were created by Drew Markham, who went on to form Xatrix Entertainment/Gray Matter Studios and develop Redneck Rampage and Return to Castle Wolfenstein, among other titles.

During the 1990s, an international ANSI art "scene" arose, a subculture of artists who formed competitive groups, similar to hackers (and sometimes overlapping these groups). These art groups periodically assembled their best pieces into downloadable "artpacks" for distribution on BBS systems. Packs were often delivered as ZIP archives containing individual ANSI art files, as well as supplemental text files giving the latest news and information about that particular art group. Some packs included special software for displaying the art or for playing accompanying music in MOD format.

The rise of the internet in the mid-1990s led to a migration of BBS users, and a decline in the number of systems, reducing the audience for ANSI art. And, as Microsoft Windows began displacing DOS as the dominant PC operating system, it became harder to use legacy ANSI art software.

By the late 1990s, the underground ANSI art scene was "steadily crumbling," and many ANSI art groups recognized they could not continue with "business as usual." There was a push to develop of Windows-compatible drawing tools like ACiDDraw and TundraDraw. But, by the early 2000s, many of the largest ANSI art groups like ACiD, ICE, CIA, Fire, and Dark had ceased releasing ANSI artpacks regularly, and some had pivoted to other forms of digital art.

In the 21st century, artists have continued to create and release new ANSI art, though the scene is significantly smaller than it once was. New groups emerged, such as Blocktronics; while some older groups like Mistigris, Fire, and Lazarus revived and began releasing occasional artpacks. ANSI art competitions are regularly held at various demoscene parties. And developers continue to produce new software for drawing ANSI art such as PabloDraw, Moebius, and DurDraw.

== Documentation and preservation ==
In 2004, Dark Domain: The Artpacks.acid.org Collection, a DVD-ROM containing fourteen years of artpacks by ACiD and numerous other groups, was released. Jason Scott devoted the Artscene episode of his 2005 BBS: The Documentary to the ANSI art scene. Scott described the episode as primarily covering the history of ACiD and iCE, and later stated that he had interviewed members of both groups and others about the artwork, releases, and internal culture of the scene. Contemporary coverage in Wired also identified ANSI art as one of the aspects of BBS culture covered by the eight-episode documentary.

== See also ==
- ANSI escape code
- List of text editors § ASCII and ANSI art
- TheDraw

== Bibliography ==
- Scott, Jason. BBS: The Documentary (DVD). Boston, MA: Bovine Ignition Systems, 2005.
- Danet, Brenda. "Cyberpl@y: Communicating Online". Oxford, UK: Berg, 2001. ISBN 1-85973-424-3.
- "Dark Domain: the artpacks.acid.org collection" (DVD-ROM). San Jose, CA, USA: ACiD Productions, LLC, 2004. ISBN 0-9746537-0-5.
- Zetter, Kim. How Humble BBS Begat Wired World. Wired News. June 8, 2005.
