= List of bulletin board systems =

This is an incomplete list of notable bulletin board systems:

- CBBS – the first BBS on record, established 1978
- Celco 51 – used by the United States Secret Service during the Operation Cybersnare sting
- Demon Roach Underground – popular hacker BBS and former home of the CULT OF THE DEAD COW
- ExecPC BBS – America's largest dial-up BBS through the late 1980s
- Forum 80 – based in Kingston upon Hull, the UK's first BBS, started in 1980
- ISCABBS – largest worldwide BBS, formerly located at the University of Iowa, and still both running and active as of 2024.
- MindVox – famous New York based BBS and internet service provider founded by members of Legion of Doom
- Monochrome BBS – BBS based in the UK, founded in 1990 and still running 2023
- pcmicro
- Plover-NET – early hacker BBS, origins of hacker group Legion of Doom
- PTT Bulletin Board System – largest BBS in Taiwan, still the most popular online forum in 2018
- Rusty n Edie's BBS – raided by the FBI in 1993 and sued by Playboy in 1997
- SDF Public Access Unix System - Started in 1987 as an ANIME SIG
- SF Net – was a coin-operated BBS accessible from select coffee shops located throughout the San Francisco Bay Area
- SMTH BBS – The largest BBS in China, hosted by Tsinghua University
- The Brewers' Witch BBS – Texas-based BBS catering to Pagan and Neopagan discussion and community
- TOTSE – Bay Area BBS known for large and often controversial selection of text files and internet discussion forum

== See also ==
- List of BBS software
- List of artscene groups
- Boardwatch magazine
- FidoNet
