= Event horizon (disambiguation) =

An event horizon is a boundary around a black hole inside which events cannot affect an outside observer.

Event horizon or Event Horizon may also refer to:

- Event Horizon Telescope, an array of radiotelescopes that form an astronomical interferometer
- One type of geological horizon
- Event Horizon Software, the original name of American computer game developer DreamForge Intertainment
- Event Horizons BBS, a bulletin board system that ran from 1983 to 1996

== Art and media ==
- Event Horizon, a fictional company in the novels of the Greg Mandel trilogy (1993–1995) by English science fiction writer Peter F. Hamilton
- Event Horizon (film), a 1997 science fiction horror film
- Event Horizon (album), a 2012 album by I Am I
- "Event Horizon" (Supergirl), a 2019 episode of Supergirl
- Event Horizon, the lead single from the 2021 album End Theory by Younha (in Korean)
- "the event horizon", a 2019 poem by Simon Armitage to commemorate opening of Halle St Peter's extension
- Event Horizon (sculpture), a 2007 site installation by Antony Gormley

== See also ==
- Event Horizon Telescope, international collaborative project
- Horizon (general relativity)
