= Mindquest =

Coordinates: 44°50′37.5″N 93°18′45″W

Mindquest (1995–2003) was the first online public high school in the United States. It operated through the Bloomington Public Schools in Bloomington, Minnesota, and was created in 1995 by Kevin Byrne within the South Hennepin Adult Programs in Education (SHAPE), a program started in 1978 for adult and alternative school within the Bloomington Public Schools. Mindquest operated until the end of 2003, when the Bloomington Schools closed it in favor of a regional distance learning program.

== Operations ==
Mindquest allowed students to earn a high school diploma completely on the Internet by means of web-based interaction between and among students, teachers, and mentors. High school juniors and seniors were able to gain extra credits or undertake their entire high school diploma. Mindquest operated via Softarc’s FirstClass communications and bulletin board software.

A key obstacle for Mindquest in its early days was visibility, as few people had access to the Internet in 1995. The original budget was $131,000 and served eighty students, both teenagers and adults. Minnesota students did not have to make tuition payments, however out-of-state students paid tuition. By 2001 there were about 300 online learners, attending 535 courses, with students enrolled from as far away as India. Mindquest was unique in that the curriculum was entirely created by Mindquest staff.

== Legacy ==
Mindquest was managed on a day-to-day basis by Julie Williams, who later developed an online charter school called Minnesota Online High School, which is still in operation in 2020. The instructional leader of SHAPE and Mindquest, Greta Ploetz, received grant funding from the Bush Foundation to create the Mindquest Academy, an online college entrance preparation program that in 2011 was still in operation through the Minnesota Department of Education.

Martin Borg, a Mindquest teacher, and Kevin Byrne created an online assessment company called Achievement Data, Inc (ADI) in 1998, and sold it to Questar in 2005. In 2008 Borg became president of Measured Progress, an assessment company based in New Hampshire. In 2000 Byrne also helped create and served on the board of BlueSky Charter School, the first online charter school in the country. In 2003 Byrne created a work-based charter high school called Minnesota Internship Center (MNIC), and as of 2011 he continued to serve as its executive director.
