= TeleFinder =

Computer network protocol

TeleFinder is a Macintosh-based bulletin-board system written by Spider Island Software, based on a client–server model whose client end provides a Mac-like GUI. It appears to be the first such system on any platform, predating Apple's own AppleLink, as well as other Mac-based BBS systems like FirstClass. In more recent years, the product has added a complete suite of "sub-servers" for popular internet protocols.

The TeleFinder software consists of 2 programs, the Server software (Macintosh only) and the GUI based client software (also called TeleFinder), which is available for both macintosh and Windows based PCs.

The TeleFinder Server could also network with other TeleFinder Server BBS computers and share email and forum messages between themselves and also over FidoNet. The TeleFinder Server System Operator (SysOp) could also use ResEdit (a Macintosh resource editor software) to create and modify profiles to give their BBS a unique GUI. These profile files were distributed by each BBS for users to download and use with the client software, if they wished to see this GUI. Otherwise, a default GUI was used instead.

TeleFinder Server and Client software was originally written by Rusty Tucker with portions by Chris Silverberg and Jim White for Spider Island Software in Irvine, California USA.

All artwork by Drew Dougherty of Attention Design (now BXC Creative).
