= Edsby =

Canadian educational technology company

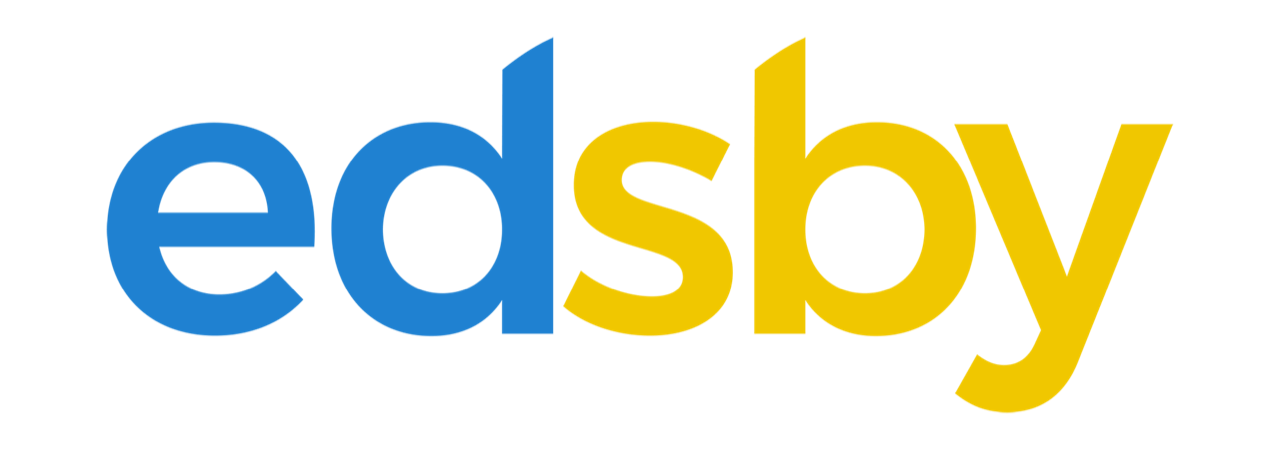
- Company type: Private
- Website type: Learning management system, analytics, social networking, data aggregation competency-based learning
- Founded: April 2010
- Headquarters: Toronto, Canada
- No. of locations: 3
- Creators: Steve Asbury, Jon Asbury, Scott Welch, John Myers
- Key people: Steve Asbury, Jon Asbury, Scott Welch, John Myers
- Industry: K-12 education
- Products: Edsby, Destinations, SignWave
- Website: www.edsby.com
- Registration: Required
- Users: Undisclosed
- Current status: Active

Edsby is an educational technology company headquartered in Toronto, Canada. It is best known as the developer and publisher of the Edsby platform, a web-based K-12 learning management system (LMS) and analytics platform. It also produces Destinations, an outcome-based education software system, and SignWave, a K-12 forms and permissions system.

Edsby is a learning management and school administration platform used by school districts, state governments, and central governments.s It includes tools for communication among students, teachers, and parents, as well as features for tracking and reporting on student learning.

Edsby is partnered with Microsoft and provides its services on the Microsoft Azure cloud service worldwide. The company was named Microsoft's Education Partner of the Year in 2019.

== History ==
Edsby was founded in April 2010 by Steve Asbury, Jon Asbury, and Scott Welch, the three founders and architects of the software application FirstClass, and co-worker John Myers. After it gained popularity in the 1990s, millions of students and teachers used this software tool with messaging and collaboration features, and it is recognized as one of the earliest learning management systems.

Edsby is privately held, and in 2014, the company acknowledged a funding round of around two million dollars. In 2020, it received a $5.3 million Series A investment. In conjunction with the raise, investor Chris Besse, former CEO of educational technology company FreshGrade and former managing director of K-12 at education publisher Nelson Education, joined the company as Chief Commercial Officer.

== Products ==
=== Edsby platform ===
The Edsby platform is developed for K–12 school districts, private schools, and governments. It provides online social learning tools connected to their existing systems, including grade books, attendance-taking, parent-teacher communication features, classroom management, content management, and social classroom interaction. Mobile applications are available for iOS and Android.

Value to K-12 stakeholders:

- Students: Check grades, homework, schedules, and collaborate in class.
- Teachers: Share materials, perform assessments, record attendance, and communicate with parents.
- Parents: Track performance, workload, and stay connected with schools.
- School Leaders: Spot at-risk students, manage approvals, and generate report cards.
- District Admins: Access real-time student success data and plan resources effectively.

In September 2013, Hillsborough County Public Schools deployed Edsby to its teachers, 220,000 students and their parents. In 2015, other district-wide deployments included 3,450 staff and 34,000 students at Kawartha Pine Ridge District School Board. In 2016, it was adopted by 35,000 students and staff at Greater Essex County District School Board. In 2017, it deployed at York Region District School Board, a 125,000-student district.

In March 2019, the New Zealand Ministry of Education contracted with Edsby to develop a national student information-sharing exchange called Te Rito. It synchronised student information systems for 800,000 New Zealand learners, their families, and communities across the country's 2,500 schools and their discrete student management systems.

In 2024, the Ministry of Education, Science and Youth in the country of Georgia selected Edsby as the national learning management and administration platform for its 640,000 students in a program supported by the World Bank.

In 2025, Edsby introduced an AI Teacher Assistant, designed to reduce educator workload by helping with tasks such as lesson planning, rubric creation, feedback generation, and personalized student support. According to MindShare Learning Chief Learning Strategist Timothy Gard, the functionality is “poised to set a precedent for how AI can be leveraged to enhance learning while supporting educators.”

=== Destinations ===
In 2026, Edsby introduced Destinations, a software system for competency-based learning. While such assessment generates a large volume of artifacts, self-assessments, and longitudinal observations, “Edsby Destinations was purpose-built to solve this complexity at scale,” wrote Eric Sheninger, education author and speaker.

=== SignWave ===
Edsby SignWave is a digital forms and workflow system intended to automate K-12 administrative processes such as field trip authorizations, policy consent forms, and fee collection by leveraging existing student information system (SIS) and other data to streamline approvals between parents, teachers, and school administrators.

== Awards ==
In 2026, Edsby was named the EdTech Awards Cool Tool Award winner for Best Learning Management System (LMS) Solution over finalists Instructure Canvas, Schoolbox and others, and winner of the 2026 Best Parent/Student Solution EdTech Award.

- 2025 Best Learning Management System, Best Learning Analytics / Data Mining App or Tool, The Tech Edvocate
- 2025 Best Learning Analytics / Data Mining Solution, EdTech Awards
- 2024 Best Learning Management System, The Tech Edvocate
- 2023 Best Learning Management System, The Tech Edvocate
- 2022 LMS Platform of the Year, EdTech Breakthrough Awards
- 2022 Best Learning Management System, The Tech Edvocate
- 2021 Remote & Blended Learning Tool for Primary (K-6) and Secondary (6–12), Tech and Learning
- 2020 EdTech Startup of the Year, MindShare Learning
- 2019 Innovator of the Year, City of Richmond Hill
- 2017 SIIA CODiE Award, Best Education Data Solution, SIIA
- 2016 SIIA CODiE Award, Best Classroom Management Solution, SIIA
