= FirstClass =

Client–server software

- A screenshot of FirstClass Client version 9
- Developers: SoftArc, Centrinity, FirstClass Division of OpenText
- Stable release: 16.2 / March 29, 2020
- Operating system: Windows, macOS, Linux (server only), iOS (client only), Android (client only)
- Type: Groupware
- License: Proprietary
- Website: firstclass.com

FirstClass is a client–server groupware, email, online conferencing, voice and fax services, and bulletin-board system for Windows, macOS, and Linux. FirstClass's primary markets are the higher-education and K-12 education sectors, including four of the top ten largest school districts in the United States (Las Vegas, NV's Clark County School District, Florida's Broward County Public Schools, Hillsborough County Public Schools, and Chicago Public Schools).

The product is part of OpenText's Portfolio Group and runs on both client and server platforms. According to the company, the product is used by over 3,000 organizations and has 9 million users worldwide. It is available on Android devices (versions 7.0 and higher), iOS devices (iOS 9 and higher), Microsoft Windows (Windows 8 and 10, as well as Windows Server 2012, 2016 and 2019) and macOS (10.13 High Sierra, 10.14 Mojave and 10.15 Catalina)

== Early history ==
FirstClass was originally a product of SoftArc, formed by three former members of Bell-Northern Research, Nortel's research arm located in downtown Toronto. The team, consisting of two brothers and a friend, Steve Asbury, Jon Asbury and Scott Welch had been the primary developers of the successful Meridian Mail system, and styled themselves as the Toronto Ideas Group. After a run-in with management, the three left and formed SoftArc as a consulting firm.

FirstClass was created in response to a request by a family friend who worked at the Scarborough Board of Education (now part of the Toronto District School Board). He asked them to find a reasonable Macintosh-based e-mail system that offered both LAN and modem support, a real GUI, and supported both private e-mail as well as public discussion areas (forums). He wanted a system that "even teachers could use". BBSes offered modem support and public forums, but typically had no LAN support and were character-based. Various LAN e-mail systems existed; those on the Mac had reasonable GUIs, but they tended to have poor modem support and few offered forums.

The team found only one product, AppleLink, which came close to filling the requirements. However, it was run on a mainframe for Apple Computer and couldn't be purchased, so the team offered to build a system under contract for $85,000. Scarborough Board really liked the HyperCard prototype, but couldn't afford the price, so they offered to buy a system for $9,000 and then help sell it to other boards. The proposal was accepted, and work on EduNet started sometime in 1989, debuting in 1990 at the ECOO conference.

The first implemented FirstClass system, operated by the Scarborough Board of Education and named "ScriBE", was administered by the Computers in Education department. It offered access to teachers, students, and parents. In the autumn of 1997, ScriBE was connected successfully to the Internet.

== FCP, the FirstClass Protocol ==
Key to FirstClass's operation was the underlying FCP (FirstClass Protocol). FCP was a transport layer networking protocol that all FirstClass communications used. The protocol guaranteed error-free communications for all activities, not just file transfers. FCP could run on several different physical layers, starting with modems and AppleTalk, and later adding Novell's IPX and TCP/IP. Both the client and server could communicate over any of these links, allowing a user to move from office to home and have access to the same server.

FCP was based on a sliding window protocol, using a wide variety of packet sizes tuned to different networking protocols. Later versions of FCP could turn off their own error correction systems when running over error-free links like TCP/IP. FCP also implemented an optional encryption system based on the Blowfish cipher. With all of these features turned off, FCP still offered good performance even on the 2400 bit/s modems common in the era.

Additionally, every FCP packet included a "task number" identifier, similar to the port identifier in TCP/IP. This allowed FCP to construct a number of "virtual links" between each client and server. The server implemented a multithreaded kernel and opened a new thread for every task requested by a client. Users could therefore upload and download files at the same time, while simultaneously reading and writing mail.

== The BBS era ==
Basic FirstClass "desktop", c. 1993

After renaming the product to the more generic FirstClass, they started demonstrating early versions to Toronto-area Mac BBSes.

An Apple Canada employee, Mark Windrim, set up a FirstClass BBS in Toronto called MAGIC (the Macintosh Awareness Group in Canada). Local Mac users heard of the system and established accounts, quickly turning it into the largest Mac-oriented BBS system in the area. Having started with a single phone line and a tiny user base, MAGIC became a commercial entity called "Magic", eventually reached 6,000 users, and had 48 phone lines.

Due to the multithreaded nature of the FirstClass client software, the user could open multiple messages at the same time, while uploading and downloading in the background. Whereas most systems indirectly encouraged users to simply "leech" files and then leave, users waiting for downloads on FirstClass had an entire modem channel free for uploading or writing.

SoftArc sought to take advantage of the growing interest by offering reduced prices to BBS operators. During this time, some FirstClass BBS systems mushroomed to thousands of users, including the Boston Computer Society (BCS), which was the largest computer club of that era; the Virginia-based DigitalNation, which had hoped to become an AOL competitor; the Berkeley Macintosh Users Group's Planet BMUG; the BendNet BBS in Bend, Oregon; and Virtual Valley services operated by Silicon Valley's Metro Newspapers group. Another notable system was the Great Lakes Free-Net, billed as "the world's first graphical Free-Net," based in Battle Creek, Michigan.

The FirstClass software later incorporated a feature that allowed individual FirstClass sites to share conference content and private mail by allowing the servers to link together. Originally this was accomplished via dial-up connections, but eventually allowed sites to link via the wider Internet. Apple employee Scott Converse formed the first and probably the most extensive network of FirstClass-based sites in the world, known as OneNet.

By 1994, the Internet was becoming a major force, obsoleting most BBS systems on both Mac and Windows over the next year or so.

== Corporate e-mail and collaboration ==
By the mid-1990s, FirstClass had evolved into a small-to-medium-sized internal e-mail system, but its BBS continued to receive attention. A FirstClass client for Microsoft Windows was introduced, along with a Windows NT-based server.

During the mid-1990s, FirstClass evolved to compete in the groupware marketplace. The product was successful to some degree, besting Microsoft Exchange in number of installed users until 1997.

FirstClass added Internet functionality and a scripting method by 2000 but both Lotus and Microsoft had introduced these features earlier and FirstClass lost market share to them. The Mac market simultaneously declined through the mid to late 1990s, eroding the product's primary customer base. Even among those organizations that considered using the FirstClass system, the lack of a robust calendaring component during this time (until FirstClass version 6 in 2001) was an obvious flaw. Nevertheless, FirstClass was recognized as a notable (though not top) vendor of worldwide integrated collaborative environments by International Data Corporation in 2004.

During this period FirstClass added a voice mail solution integrated with the server. The feature, commonly known as unified messaging, allowed users to receive voice, fax and e-mail in their mailbox.

In 2007 with the release of version 9, FirstClass redesigned its interface and introduced an automatic server-based and policy-driven archiving service for legal compliance purposes, and full Unicode support.

By the end of 2010, version 11 was released, with mobile clients for Apple iOS, Android and Blackberry made available during 2011. IMAP mail and RSS support was added in version 11.1 in 2012.

== Tools ==
FirstClass Application Services or "FCAS" (formerly called "RAD" for "Rapid Application Development") allows third-party developers to create tools and applications for use with FirstClass. The BASIC-like language is documented in the FirstClass client's online Help, under Customization Tools, FCAS, Language Reference.

With the release of FirstClass 12, FirstClass introduces a fully supported and documented Application Programming Interface (API) that will allow web developers to retrieve authenticated secure information from their FirstClass Collaborative system, and display it within their own web site. FirstClass API

== Company history ==
In 1999 the company arranged a reverse takeover by a company from Vancouver to become listed on the Toronto Stock Exchange as Centrinity. In September 2002 OpenText bought Centrinity, for a reported Can$1.26 per share or Can$19 million. OpenText was developing a suite of online collaboration products through a series of mergers, and FirstClass's educational background seemed to fit particularly well with some of their other offerings. At the time OpenText stated their intention to integrate FirstClass into the "LiveLink" Internet information collection engine, but this integration has not yet happened and is rumored to be not practical due to the architecture of LiveLink.

As of March 31, 2010, the original founders of the FirstClass product and company (Steve Asbury, Jon Asbury, and Scott Welch) and two longtime employees (John Myers and Barry Carter) are no longer employed by OpenText; the only reason given was a difference of opinions in the future direction of the FirstClass product and other derivative products. They have since developed Edsby, a product that blends social media and classroom management tools.

The next year would see many other key team members voluntarily move on to new challenges. Among those departing were the UX designers behind FirstClass' rebirth as OpenText Social Media: one for Research In Motion, the other to start his own company. In June and August 2011, there were two more rounds of layoffs. Long-time employees Paul Whittemore, Desmond Ong, and Julie Oke, along with several others, asked to be included. Senior managers Terry Whyte and Dave Wormald left over the course of the summer.

OpenText continues to develop the FirstClass software suite which has been opened up to support external "Apps".

== Market share challenges ==
As free offerings from Google Apps for Education and Office 365 for Education have become increasingly popular and functional, the traditional paid product that FirstClass offers has apparently become more difficult to justify in educational environments.

== See also ==
- Mindquest
