= Tim Stryker =

Computer programmer (1954–1996)

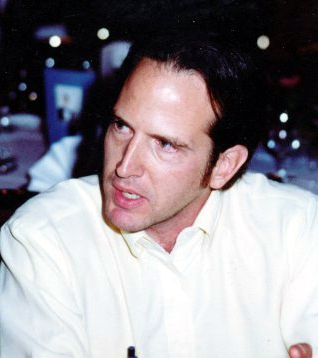
- at TwoBBScon event in Düsseldorf, Germany
- Born: Timothy J. Stryker; 9 December 1954
- Died: 6 August 1996 (aged 41); Colorado, US
- Other name: Stryker
- Occupations: Video game designer Computer programmer
- Known for: The Major BBS; Aztarac video game

Timothy J. Stryker, better known as Tim Stryker or Stryker (9 December 1954 – 6 August 1996) was a computer programmer who created MajorBBS, a computer bulletin board software package. With Ken Wasserman he wrote the 1980 game Flash Attack for the Commodore PET, then he created the color vector arcade video game Aztarac (1983) for Centuri.

== Education ==
Stryker graduated from Northfield Mount Hermon School in 1972, and received his bachelor's degree in physics from Brown University in 1977.

== Game development ==
Stryker and Ken Wasserman wrote the real-time strategy game Flash Attack (1980) for the Commodore PET personal computer. It is written in a custom Forth-derived programming language called RPL. Stryker developed a cable so that two PET computers can be linked to play against each other. The game was later rewritten for MS-DOS, allowing up to four players in real time, interconnected by modems dialed into MajorBBS.

Stryker authored arcade vector game Aztarac released by Centuri in 1983. It was not a commercial success, and its rarity has made it sought after by collectors. During the attract mode of the game, quickly spinning the spinner control reveals a message in the starfield: "Designed by T. Stryker".

== The MajorBBS ==
Stryker founded Galacticomm in 1985 and created The Major BBS. It supports real-time teleconference, gaming, discussion forums, user profiles (registry), and file transfer sections.

Later, Stryker hired Scott Brinker, originally of Moonshae Isles BBS, who created many of the early games available for MajorBBS, including Kyrandia.

== Personal life & death ==
Tim Stryker was a staunch advocate of electronic democracy, and began a movement called Superdemocracy to computerize voting and help people follow politics in cyberspace. He dreamed of creating the "perfect society based on compassion and love".

Stryker suffered from severe depression, and died by suicide on 6 August 1996 at the age of 41.

== Other works ==
=== Books ===
- Stryker, Tim (1993). Think a little: Evolutionary Perspectives On The Future Of Civilization (1 ed.). Boca Raton, Florida: Cool Hand Communications. ISBN 1-56790-025-9.

=== Art ===
- STRYKER ART (1993-1994) - Stryker produced several computer art images, from which only 150 prints each were made, and each one was numbered, signed and dated by the artist. The printing technique took the digital output of the artist's custom computer software directly to transparencies, from which each print was lovingly created, direct-to-positive on ultra-high-gloss Fuji film. STRYKER ART was distributed by Consensus Systems, Inc. in Plantation, Florida.

=== Unpublished ===
- What Goes Around (1995 - preliminary copy available)
