= Pcmicro =

pcmicro was a large Bulletin Board System (BBS) support site from 1981 to 1998. Before the World Wide Web became popular, the pcmicro BBS served as a central file repository for all non-commercial BBS software and related utilities. The BBS was a FidoNet member from 1991 to 1997, and was a support and distribution site for several shareware and freeware BBS packages including RemoteAccess, Proboard, and EleBBS. pcmicro later released a Telnet communications driver named NetFoss which allows DOS-based BBS software to be used over Telnet.

While the BBS is no longer in service today, its entire collection of freeware and shareware BBS software and utilities can be found on the BBS Archives at http://archives.thebbs.org, or the mirror https://mirrors.archeobits.com/bbs/archives.thebbs.org/. It contains thousands of third-party add-ons for BBS packages.

== See also ==
- List of BBS software
- FidoNet
