= Plover-NET =

Popular bulletin board system

Plover-NET, often misspelled Plovernet, was a popular bulletin board system in the early 1980s. Hosted in New York state and originally owned and operated by a teenage hacker who called himself Quasi-Moto, whom was a member of the short lived yet famed Fargo 4A phreak group. The popular bulletin board system attracted a large group of hackers, telephone phreaks, engineers, computer programmers, and other technophiles, at one point reaching over 600 users until LDX, a long distance phone company, began blocking all calls to its number (516-935-2481).

== Naming and creation ==
The name Plover-NET came from a conversation between Quasi Moto, and Greg Schaefer. The topic of computer games came up. One of them, the 'Extended Adventure' game which was based on the 'Original Adventure' fantasy computer game was mentioned. This game was available on Compuserve and during game play the magic word PLOVER had to be used.

Past sysop of Plover-NET included Eric Corley, under the pseudonym Emmanuel Goldstein, and Lex Luthor, the founder of the notorious hacker group Legion of Doom.

Quasi-Moto personally recounted the creation of Plover-NET,

I met Lex in person while we lived in Florida during the Fall of 1983 after corresponding via email on local phreak boards. I was due to move to Long Island, New York (516 Area Code) soon after and asked him about starting up a phreak BBS. He agreed to help and flew up during his Christmas break from school in late December 1983. We worked feverishly for a couple of days to learn the GBBS Bulletin Board software which was to run on my Apple with a 300 baud Hayes micoSLOWdom %micromodem% and make modifications as necessary. The system accepted its first phone call from Lex in the first week of January 1984 and it became chronically busy soon after.

== Legion of Doom ==
Lex Luthor, under the age of 18 at the time, was a COSMOS (Central System for Mainframe Operations) expert, when he operated Plover-NET. At the time there were a few hacking groups in existence, such as Fargo-4A and Knights of Shadow. Lex was admitted into KOS in early 1984, but after making a few suggestions about new members, and having them rejected, Lex decided to put up an invitation only BBS and to start forming a new group. Starting around May 1984 he began using is position on Plover-NET to contact people he had seen on Plover-NET and people he knew personally who possessed the kind of superior knowledge that the group he envisioned should have. He was never considered to be the "mastermind of the Legion of Doom", more the cheerleader and recruiting officer.

== 2600 ==
Luthor met 2600 Magazine editor, Emmanuel Goldstein on the Pirates Cove, another 516 pirate/phreak BBS. He invited Goldstein onto Plover and it wasn't long before it became an 'official' 2600 bbs of sorts. When a user logged off the system, a plug for 2600 was displayed with their subscription prices and addresses.

== Operations ==
The Board initially ran on three Apple disk drives with 143 K byte capacity. After a few months of operation, New York hacker Paul Muad'Dib appeared at a TAP meeting being held at "Eddies" in Greenwich Village with a RANA Elite III disk drive in hand. The RANA Elite III had a capacity of about 600 KB which put the total storage capacity of the BBS to just over one Megabyte, fairly large for a phreak board in those days. They gladly accepted the donation but did not ask how he obtained the disk drive. The RANA was later passed on to Lex which he used to house his extensive collection of phreak philes that were available to Legion of Doom BBS users. The location of the overworked RANA is currently unknown although Lex believes he sent it back to Muad'Dib around 1986.

In early 1985 Plover-NET officially closed permanently after Quasi-Moto moved back to Florida and was unable to gain traction in re-establishing the bulletin board when he put it back up after moving.
