= Aztarac =

1983 video game

- Arcade flyer
- Developer: Centuri
- Publisher: Centuri
- Designer: Tim Stryker
- Platform: Arcade
- Release: NA: October 1983
- Genre: Multidirectional shooter
- Mode: Single-player

Aztarac is a scrolling multidirectional shooter with color vector graphics. It was developed by Tim Stryker and released in arcades by Centuri in 1983. The player commands an intergalactic race of mutant humans whose mode of transport is a tank. Its turret is independently controlled, allowing the player to move in one direction while shooting in another. The mission is to guard space outposts from hordes of incoming enemy ships. Aztarac's color vector graphics were impressive at the time of release, and a circular plastic lens over the screen accentuates the visuals. Few machines were produced, though the exact number is unclear. Centuri only developed two vector games; Aztarac was the second.

== Gameplay ==
The player's red and blue tank is in the center.

Four outposts are located in the center of a scrolling playfield, and the player must protect them from waves of enemy attackers. A flight-style joystick moves the player's tank; a trigger on the joystick shoots; a separate knob rotates the tank's turret independently of movement; and a button activates a scanner which shows where offscreen enemies are.

== Reception ==
According to Tony Temple of The Arcade Blogger, Aztarac was an obscure release:

But despite the stunning visuals (for the time at least), the game was not a commercial success at all. There are various estimates of the number of Aztaracs actually built – many put the figure at 500, but based on Centuri’s 1983 annual report, it seems that perhaps less than 200 is a more likely figure.

== Legacy ==
One of the few Aztarac machines still in existence was discovered and restored in 2016. It turned out to be the one originally owned by the game's creator, Tim Stryker.

Dennis Bartlett of Iowa, USA, scored a world record 142,390 points on Aztarac on February 11, 1984.
