= Scott Brinker =

American computer programmer

Scott Brinker, born 28 September 1971 in Ft. Lauderdale, Florida, is a computer programmer and entrepreneur. He currently serves as the VP of platform ecosystem of HubSpot, a customer relationship management (CRM) platform and is known for his marketing technology "supergraphic."

== Education ==
Brinker initially attended the University of Miami on early admission during his junior year in high school, but withdrew when he joined Galacticomm full-time in 1991. In 2002, Brinker returned to school part-time at the School of General Studies at Columbia University in New York City, where he graduated summa cum laude with a B.S. in Computer Science as valedictorian of his graduating class. In 2007, he graduated from the MIT Sloan School of Management with an M.B.A. and was a part-time Sloan Fellow.

== Career ==
Brinker was the second customer of, and eventually one of the first employees of, Galacticomm, the company founded by Tim Stryker that created The Major BBS. He purchased The Major BBS and one of Galacticomm's multi-modem cards in September 1986 when he was 15 years old and launched Moonshae Isles BBS in South Florida.

In collaboration with Stryker and Richard Skurnick, he created a number of multi-player adventure games for The Major BBS between 1986 and 1990, including Quest for Magic and Kyrandia.

In January 1991, Brinker joined Galacticomm as vice president, primarily leading the company's marketing efforts. In April 1993, he was promoted to president and CEO at age 21. In 1994, Brinker presented Corporate Applications of BBSs at One BBSCON In 1996, Galacticomm brought on Robert Shaw as CEO, and in October 1996, Galacticomm was sold to a group led by Peter Berg and Yannick Tessier. Brinker sold his interest in the company at that time and left to pursue a new venture with Christopher Robert, the then CTO of Galacticomm.

Some of Brinker's experiences with Galacticomm are recounted in the film BBS: The Documentary.

In 1998, Brinker co-founded ion interactive, inc. with Anna Talerico, Justin Talerico, and Christopher Robert. i-on interactive was initially a boutique web development firm with clients that included Citrix, Office Depot, Siemens, and Yahoo!. Brinker served as president and chief technology officer of the company.

Starting in 2005, Brinker and the Talericos began to develop a post-click marketing platform called LiveBall, a software-as-a-service landing page management system. In 2007, the company stopped taking on new web development projects and focused on building this new business, which Brinker has described as "landing pages 2.0".

Brinker began the MarTech industry conference in 2014 in Boston and now runs them twice a year.

In September 2017, Brinker joined HubSpot as Vice President of Platform Ecosystem.

== Marketing Technology Supergraphic ==
In 2008, Brinker started Chief Martec, which began as a blog "examining the intersection of marketing, technology, and management." It is best known for the marketing technology landscape supergraphic, which was first published in August 2011.

The graphic charts the proliferation of marketing technologies and has been regularly updated since its inception. It is one of the most well-known marketing charts.

== Personal life ==
Brinker is married to Jill Geiser, they have a daughter and currently live in the Boston area.
