= Skypix =

Markup language

Skypix is a markup language used to encode graphics content such as changeable fonts, mouse-controlled actions, animations and sound to bulletin board systems. The system was written by Michael Cox on the Amiga in 1988, and first hosted on the Atredes BBS system, which was later renamed Skyline. Skypix allowed BBS sysops to create interactive BBS systems with graphics, fonts, mouse-controlled actions, animations and sound.

Skypix used an extension of the ANSI graphics system that added new instructions. The graphics were normally created using Skypaint, which could generate Skypix files directly from a familiar-looking paint program. The files could be placed in the system and any Skypix-enabled terminal program would notice the encoding and recreate the graphics.

The underlying BBS software could be programmed in the ARexx language (a variant of REXX for the Amiga). This resulted in an enthusiastic group of Skypix hobbyists.

Skypix was available only on the Amiga computer, hosted on the Skyline BBS and accessed using the Skyterm terminal emulator. Skypix support was later implemented in JR-Comm by Johnathan Radigan. At one time, over a thousand Skyline systems were operating the world over. Amiga inventor Jay Miner himself ran a Skyline system for a time.

With the terminal program JR-Comm, other BBS software programs started to support Skypix. C-Net Amiga Pro BBS Software was one of them. Today, there are several of these boards still alive using Telnet. One of these boards still offers Skypix graphics when using JR-Comm.
