= I Am I (band) =

British heavy metal band (2012–2016)

I AM I
- I AM I band logo.

Background information
- Origin: London, England
- Genres: Heavy metal, power metal, AOR
- Years active: 2012–2016
- Labels: ZeePeeTee, Avalon (Japan)
- Past members: ZP Theart; Rich Smith; Andrew Kopczyk; Gavin Thomas; Dean Markham; Paul Clark Jr.; Jake Thorsen; Jacob Ziemba; Neil Salmon; Andy Midgley
- Website: iamiofficial.com

I Am I (stylised I ΛM I) were a British heavy metal band led by former DragonForce vocalist ZP Theart. They released their debut album Event Horizon in 2012, followed by two singles, one of which is a cover of John Farnham's "You're the Voice" and the other an original song titled "See You Again".

== History ==
After ZP Theart left DragonForce in 2010, he took a year off from doing music, but his friends and family encouraged him to get back into the musical scene. He found a group of musicians through the internet which he felt fitted the idea for the band he wanted for his new project which would be later named I AM I. ZP came across Jacob and Neil while looking for other musicians and was particularly interested in Ziemba's songwriting and playing style. Event Horizon was recorded in Ritch Bitch Studios, Birmingham during late 2011 to early 2012 with the album being released independently on 26 May 2012. I AM I were the first metal band ever to release an album solely on USB.

In 2014 guitarists Jacob Ziemba and Andy Midgley and bassist Neil Salmon were replaced by Andrew Kopczyk and Gavin Owen on guitar and Dean Markham on bass, respectively although no new music was released.

=== Event Horizon and "See You Again" (2011–2012) ===
The album, Event Horizon, was released on 26 May 2012 with their debut show following the next day at the Birmingham O2 Academy 2.

The album was released through ZeePeeTee LTD in 2012 (Zee Pee Tee being a play on lead vocalist ZP Theart's own name).

At their appearance on the main stage at Bloodstock Open Air on 11 August 2012 it was announced that "Event Horizon" would receive a worldwide physical CD and digital release. This would also include a separate Japanese edition of the album which would contain a bonus track titled "Inside of Me".

During the Access Small Area's UK tour of 2012, the band played a cover of the hit single 'You're The Voice' by John Farnham. A cover version of this song was released at Christmas 2012 from online purchase only.

=== Second studio album (2013–2014) ===
In 2013, the band released a hard rock power ballad titled "See You Again". Although it did not appear on any charts, it is the band's highest rated and most popular song to date.

On 15 August 2014, drummer Rich Smith confirmed I AM I is preparing a new album that might be finished by the end of the same year, but no updates were ever given.

== Band members ==
- ZP Theart – vocals (2012–2016)
- Rich Smith – drums (2013–2016)
- Andrew Kopczyk – guitars (2016)
- Gavin Thomas – guitars (2016)
- Dean Markham – bass (2016)
- Paul Clark Jr. – drums (2012)
- Jake Thorsen – guitars (2012)
- Phil Martini – drums (2012–2013)
- Jacob Ziemba – guitars (2012–2016)
- Neil Salmon – bass (2012–2016)
- Andy Midgley – guitars (2013–2016)

== Discography ==
=== Singles ===
- "You're the Voice" – single (2012)
- "See You Again" – single (2013)

=== Albums ===
- Event Horizon (2012)
- Age of Anarchy (Unreleased)
