= ExecPC BBS =

ExecPC
- Type: Private
- Industry: Internet and Telecommunication
- Founded: 1983
- Founder: Bob Mahoney
- Headquarters: Milwaukee, Wisconsin, USA
- Products: Internet access and Web hosting
- Parent: LocalNet Internet Services, Inc.
- Website: www.execpc.com

ExecPC is an online service provider started in 1983 by owner Bob Mahoney as the Exec-PC BBS. It quickly grew to be one of the world's largest bulletin board systems in the 1980s and throughout the 1990s, competing with the likes of Compuserve and Prodigy.

ExecPC began offering Internet access in 1994 as ExecPC Internet, and being based in New Berlin, Wisconsin, quickly grew to be the largest Internet service provider in Wisconsin. The company was sold in 1998 to Voyager.net of East Lansing, Michigan. After a lengthy series of acquisitions, the assets are now held by LocalNet of Buffalo, New York.

== History ==
=== The Exec-PC BBS ===
Exec PC BBS

The Exec-PC BBS launched on November 28, 1983, in the den of owner Bob Mahoney and his wife Tracey. This was in the earliest days of BBSing, and in contrast to most systems that used one of the many shareware BBS systems, ExecPC was a custom system written in the Clipper database system. This allowed them to add new features to the system throughout its lifetime.

Known primarily for its extensive shareware software archives, the BBS also offered E-mail, message forums, and BBS door games to paying subscribers. As the file archives grew in size, Mahoney created the Hyperscan feature, allowing members to quickly search for files by keyword—a common feature today, but rare at the time. Mahoney became one of the earliest BBS operators to begin charging a fee for access to a BBS. The Exec-PC BBS grew to over 250 lines, with over 300 GB of file storage at its peak in the mid-90s. Callers could connect to the Exec-PC BBS via long distance at no additional charge, or connect to any CompuServe local access number for a per-minute fee.

In 1996, the file collection of the Exec-PC BBS was placed on the world-wide web through the Filepile.com web site. Filepile.com was officially abandoned in 1999 having been made obsolete by other Internet services.

=== Exec-PC Chat ===
One of the major missing features of the Exec-PC BBS was the ability to speak with other members of the service in chat rooms. Instead of building chat functionality into the BBS, Mahoney created a separate system, Exec-PC Chat, which ran alongside the Exec-PC BBS. This system was a Major BBS-based system with 48 lines. While popular, the chat system did not prove to be profitable, and Mahoney divested himself of the system. The former Exec-PC Chat ran under the name Over the Edge until shutting down in 1996.

=== ExecPC Internet ===
Sensing the promise of the Internet, Mahoney built Internet functionality into the Exec-PC BBS in 1994. When calling into certain numbers known as "gold nodes," the BBS member was connected to an Internet shell account on servers run by IBM's VNET division. This solution quickly proved to be slow and confusing to members, so Mahoney set up a separate division of the company that same year to provide dialup access via both shell accounts and Point-to-Point Protocol (PPP). Unlike the BBS, ExecPC Internet provided service exclusively to individuals in Wisconsin and northern Illinois.

ExecPC Internet proved to be tremendously popular, and grew from its first paying subscribers in 1994 to just over 80,000 subscribers in 1998. As it grew, the company added business-class access services such as ISDN and T1 lines, as well as web hosting service.

=== Mergers and acquisitions ===
In September, 1998, Mahoney sold ExecPC to East Lansing, Michigan–based Voyager.net. Voyager.net was purchased by CoreComm Ltd. in October, 2000, who then, through other acquisitions, became ATX Communications in 2004. In December, 2005, ATX Communications sold the remaining ExecPC assets and customer base to LocalNet of Buffalo, New York, the current operators.

== LocalNet ==
LocalNet Internet Services, Inc. begun in Buffalo, New York, sells dial-up Internet access, web hosting services and Digital subscriber line Internet access.
