= BlueSky Charter School =

Location
- Minnesota
- Coordinates: 44°53′54.5″N 93°5′1″W

Information
- Type: online charter school

BlueSky was the first charter school in Minnesota to be completely online, following on from Mindquest, which was the first online public high school. When BlueSky opened, a law was passed that made online schools have to spend at least two days per week in a traditional classroom with a teacher, but BlueSky was already completely online so it was allowed to stay. The law was later repealed.

In June 2005, BlueSky had its first graduating class. Seventeen students graduated, and two graduation ceremonies were held: one in Bloomington for students from the metro area, and one in International Falls for students from the northern part of Minnesota. In January 2006, BlueSky held a mid-year graduation ceremony in Saint Paul for seven students that had finished their graduation requirements at the end of the first semester.

The school serves students from seventh grade through twelfth grade.
