= Lanstar =

LANStar (Lanstar) was a 2.56 Mbit/s twisted-pair local area network created by Northern Telecom in the mid '80s. Because NT's PBX systems already owned a building's twisted pair plant (for voice), it made sense to use the same wiring for data as well. LANStar was originally to be a component of NT's PTE (Packet Transport Equipment) product, which was a sort of minicomputer arrangement with dumb (VT220) terminals on the desktop and the CPUs in an intelligent rack (the PTE) in the PBX room (alongside the PBX). The PTE was to have several basic office automation apps: word processing, database, etc. Just as NT was doing Beta testing of the PTE, PCs and PC networking took off, effectively killing the PTE before it completed Beta.

Given the investment already sunk into the product, NT attempted to repackage the PTE as a small (dorm-room-refrigerator sized) cabinet (the PTE-S, 'S' for 'small') containing only LANStar controllers and supporting up to 112 nodes. LANStar had cards for the PC/XT, PC/AT and MacII and supported NetBIOS, Banyan, Novell, and AppleTalk.

LANStar was discontinued in 1990.

The name "LANStar" was coined by NT Product Marketing manager Paul Masters: he heard of AT&T's proposed StarLAN product and created a similar name in order to piggyback on all the publicity surrounding AT&T's product.

== See also ==
- Meridian Mail - The voicemail system that also used the PTE
