= Ward Christensen =

American computer pioneer (1945–2024)

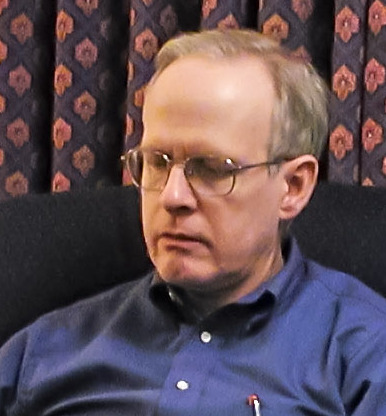
- Christensen in 2002
- Born: Ward Leon Christensen; October 23, 1945; West Bend, Wisconsin, U.S.
- Died: October 11, 2024 (aged 78); Rolling Meadows, Illinois, U.S.
- Education: Milton College (BA)
- Occupation: Computer scientist
- Known for: First bulletin board system (BBS); XMODEM Protocol

Ward Leon Christensen (October 23, 1945 – October 11, 2024) was an American computer scientist who was the inventor of the XMODEM file transfer protocol and a co-founder of the CBBS bulletin board, the first bulletin board system (BBS) ever brought online.

== Early life ==
Christensen was born on October 23, 1945, in West Bend, Wisconsin, to Florence (née Hohmann) and Roy Christensen. His father was a safety director at West Bend Company and his mother sold World Book encyclopedias. Christensen also had a brother, Donald Christensen.

Christensen attended West Bend High School. In his senior year of high school in 1963, he created a computer that won first place in a science fair. After graduating high school, Christensen attended the University of Wisconsin–Madison before transferring to Milton College. He graduated from Milton College with a Bachelor of Arts degree in physics and chemistry in 1968.

== Career ==
Christensen, along with collaborator Randy Suess, members of the Chicago Area Computer Hobbyists' Exchange (CACHE), started development of the first BBS during a blizzard in Chicago, Illinois, and officially established CBBS four weeks later, on February 16, 1978. CACHE members frequently shared programs and had long been discussing some form of file transfer, and the two used the downtime during the blizzard to implement it.

In 1968, Christensen was hired by IBM as a systems engineer in the sales office. Christensen would work for IBM until his retirement in 2012. His last position with IBM was a field technical sales specialist.

Christensen was noted for building software tools for his needs. He wrote a cassette-based operating system before floppy disks and hard disks were common. When he lost track of the source code for some programs, he wrote ReSource, an iterative disassembler for the Intel 8080, to help him regenerate the source code. In 1977, he wrote XMODEM, a protocol to send computer files over phone lines. Jerry Pournelle wrote in 1983 of a collection of CP/M public-domain software that "probably 50 percent of the really good programs were written by Ward Christensen, a public benefactor." In May 2005, Christensen and Suess were both featured in BBS: The Documentary. Christensen taught soldering techniques, until his death, through Build-a-Blinkie, a non-profit organization that hosts "learn-to-solder" events in the Great Lakes area.

== Personal life ==
Christensen lived in Dolton, Illinois, when he invented XMODEM in 1977 and co-invented CBBS in 1978. Christensen died from a heart attack at his home in Rolling Meadows, Illinois, on October 11, 2024, at the age of 78. At the time of his death, he was in a relationship with Debra Adamson. He also left behind his brother, Donald, and his nieces, Carin and Dana Christensen.

== Awards ==
Christensen received two 1992 Dvorak Awards for Excellence in Telecommunications, one with Randy Suess for developing the first BBS, and a lifetime achievement award "for outstanding contributions to PC telecommunications." In 1993, he received the Pioneer Award from the Electronic Frontier Foundation.
