= Rusty n Edie's BBS =

A typical ASCII advertisement for Rusty n Edie's BBS.

Rusty n Edie's BBS (Rusty-N-Edie's) was a bulletin board system founded on May 11, 1987, by the two SysOps, Russell & Edwina Hardenburgh, of Boardman, Ohio. At one point the BBS had over 14,000 subscribers across the United States, Canada, and Europe (each paying an $89 annual membership fee) and over 124 modem lines.

On January 30, 1993, the system was raided by the FBI for software piracy after a several month investigation in cooperation with the Software Publishers Association (SPA). On March 11, 1993, a copyright infringement lawsuit was filed by Playboy Enterprises in response to 412 adult GIF images available for download, which had come from the pages of Playboy magazine, and had been scanned in. The case was dismissed on February 3, 1998, after a settlement was reached.

== Quotations ==
The SPA should protect the BBS operator from having equipment confiscated. These are computers, not drugs or illegal weapons! The rationale means any PC Magazine reader suspected of having pirated software may have a PC confiscated. As in Stalin's Russia, it only takes a tip from an unfriendly neighbor. The SPA is that neighbor today. A disgruntled employee or jilted lover will be that neighbor tomorrow

— John C. Dvorak, PC Magazine
