= ISCABBS =

ISCABBS, also known as ISCA, is a computer bulletin board system ("BBS"), formerly based at the University of Iowa. "Daves' own version of Citadel" (DOC), an early branch of the Citadel/UX BBS software, was developed to run ISCA. Like most Citadels, the focus is almost entirely on conversation among users.

== History ==
Governed by, and named for the Iowa Student Computer Association (ISCA), ISCABBS was started in 1989. Previously a computer conferencing software program entitled "Participate" made by Unison (Iowa students referred to it as "Parti") resided on the University of Iowa's Prime mainframe computer (running the Primos operating system) and was accessible to all University students.

=== Precursors ===
Many of the Parti users had migrated over from a student created BBS called BBS1 (circa 1985) which was accessed from its creator's personal account "astran" on the University of Iowa mainframe computer PrimeA. BBS1 was created and administered by Randy Frank (Mr Nybble) and David Richards (The Oracle) after they realized the popularity of their games and the hidden messaging system that was available from within the games. The original message system was concealed inside their "Draw Poker" game and allowed the creators the ability to convey progress and leave notes regarding current projects. The board was promoted across campus on flyers placed in computer labs. Users took on handles and developed a culture of their own with socialization being the main use of the board. A BBS1 user group was started and held infrequent meetings and offered T-shirts with a mystical picture and the caption "BBS1: A meeting of the minds". The software eventually was altered and passed around by a rogue sysop in a version known as "STEALTH" which could be compiled and executed on a user's own personal account. The main message system files were no longer safe or private once the general user population learned the directory names. The anonymity of a handle was proven to be non-existent and the cracked software allowed anybody to read any file they chose and track users back to their originating personal accounts.

=== DOC creation ===
Several student programmers began to create an improved code using the Citadel framework. As several developers were named "Dave" - including two key developers of the early software - it was coined "Dave's own version of " or "DOC" (Note: Often, this has been written "Daves' own version..." to note the plurality of Daves involved in the project). The Daves include the project leader "Doctor Dave" Lacey, who is now an M.D., and Dave "Screaming Fist" Nelson. Originally ISCABBS was run on the University of Iowa's Engineering Departments Iowa Computer Aided Engineering Network "ICAEN" and accessible only by engineering students. However, ISCABBS was soon made available to all University of Iowa students and then to anyone with an internet connection. In addition to the BBS, a file sharing system was made available for freeware and shareware, and at one point was one of the most popular repositories in the Simtel file distribution network.

=== Peak of popularity ===
At its peak just before the rise of the World Wide Web, it supported more than a thousand users online simultaneously and a virtual velvet-roped queue in which hundreds more waited to log in when the system was very busy. The popularity of ISCA as a meeting place, hangout, and occasionally a virtual dive bar gives a glimpse of what modern day chat rooms would become. Between serious discussion on topics ranging from social issues and politics to computer and home repair, lighthearted babble about almost any topic can be found. In addition, instant messaging (called eXpress Messages - or simply Xes - in the lingo of DOC BBSes and other citadel-derived systems) provides a venue for private discussion and conversation.

Before the rise of the Web, ISCABBS was one of the largest free public bulletin board systems in the world. It continues on today as a likely candidate for the most active telnet-based BBS in the world.

=== Moving to new software ===
At one point the BBS was poised to cut over to a new platform called Gestalt. It was a project developed almost entirely by Lee Brintle (also known as "Tanj"), an ISCA member and former BBS Sysop. ISCA (the Iowa Student Computer Association) was offered free license to use this new BBS platform which offered not only integration with the old BBS platform but also enabled developers to construct instant messaging, email, and web-based interfaces to the BBS, much like many modern messageboards have today. The cutover was scheduled for "sometime in 1998" and would have enabled the BBS to very easily run on commodity hardware (Intel PCs) rather than expensive, proprietary, and increasingly hard-to-obtain HP workstations. Conflicts over licensing terms, ownership, and other interpersonal issues caused the cutover to Gestalt to never happen.
As of September 23, 2014, ISCA was permanently migrated over to a Linux-based virtual when the original system exhibited some issues. Most of the functionality remains identical with a few changes, such as adding eXpress message retention, and removing delays during registration and idle account deletions.

=== Moving away from the University of Iowa ===
The ISCA student group created a non-profit corporation (Iowa Student Computing Alumni) and separated from the University of Iowa on December 16, 2006.

The domain name has been changed to bbs.iscabbs.com from bbs.isca.uiowa.edu.

== Infrastructure ==
ISCABBS originally supported over a thousand simultaneous users on a 50 MHz PA-RISC system with 64MB of RAM, which ran HP-UX. In later years, the system was upgraded to an 80 MHz processor and 128MB of RAM, though the active user base is much smaller. Connectivity was provided by the University of Iowa. Due to the popularity of the BBS and its limited resources, much effort went into shrinking the size of the BBS process in memory. Stripped-down versions of standard libraries were written that included only the handful of functions that the BBS required to operate.

When ISCA separated from the University of Iowa to become its own non-profit organization, the BBS was moved to a new co-location hosting facility in Iowa City, Iowa. ISCABBS ran on an HP Visualize model B132L workstation, with a 132 MHz processor, 192 MB of RAM, and two 2 GB SCSI disks. However, as noted above, it has now migrated to a Linux virtual hosted by user Chris Gauthier (Copper Lethe).

== Features ==
=== Topical discussion areas ===
ISCABBS has the capability of having 200 forums (formerly known as rooms) for discussion of assigned topics. Forum Moderators are assigned to each forum are responsible to ensure compliance with the topicality of the forum as well as ISCABBS boardwide Policy.

=== Instant messaging ===
eXpress messaging is another functionality which allows users to send up to five lines of an instant or "express" message to another user. These messages are not permanently stored; only messages received and sent during the current user session can be reviewed.

=== Internal mailing ===
A special mail forum allows for private messages of unlimited length to be sent to and from users. These messages are stored for a significant period of time (typically three to nine months).

=== Client interface ===
Multiple clients have been created to ease interface with ISCABBS, provide additional features as well as distribute a portion of ISCABBS's overhead from the ISCABBS machine to the client machine. Client programs gained popularity amongst BBS users during the mid-1990s, when client users were able to shorten their wait in queue before login. Clients remain in common use for their various graphical, navigational, and communication functions, as well as one-click ease of connectivity. Clients can be found at BBSClient.net.

== Events ==
=== ISCANic ===
ISCABBS has semi-annual picnic or "ISCANIC" events held in Iowa City, Iowa, typically with parties and/or gatherings following. Recently annual camping or "CampNic" events have been added. Various regional "NICs" have been held on a more irregular schedule. These events have been held for nearly fifteen years, though none have occurred in recent memory.

=== CampNic ===
Recently an annual "CampNic" is held at Whitebreast Campground at Lake Red Rock near Knoxville, IA for more "outdoorsey" meetings of the members of ISCABBS.

== ISCA Not for Profit Corporation ==
On December 16, 2007, control of the BBS transferred to the Iowa Student Computing Alumni, an Iowa not for profit corporation. This ended the association between ISCABBS and the University of Iowa.

=== Initial membership requirements ===
Membership of the new ISCA is open to all BBS users subject to approval by a 2/3 majority of existing members and payment of annual dues. Meetings are held on-line rather than in Iowa City.

=== Policy Board ===
The Iowa Student Computing Alumni have elected a seven-member policy board to govern day-to-day operations of the BBS. Four seats are opened for election in the spring, and three in the autumn for one-year terms.
