= The Major BBS =

Bulletin board system

The Major BBS (sometimes MajorBBS or MBBS) was a bulletin board system server developed by Galacticomm.

It received regular coverage in both mainstream and specialist computing press. A review in PC Magazine described it as easy to install but difficult to configure, while Computerworld noted its adoption by the U.S. Department of Commerce. The system was also profiled in trade magazines such as BBS Magazine and Boardwatch.

A game called MajorMUD could be played on MajorBBS servers.

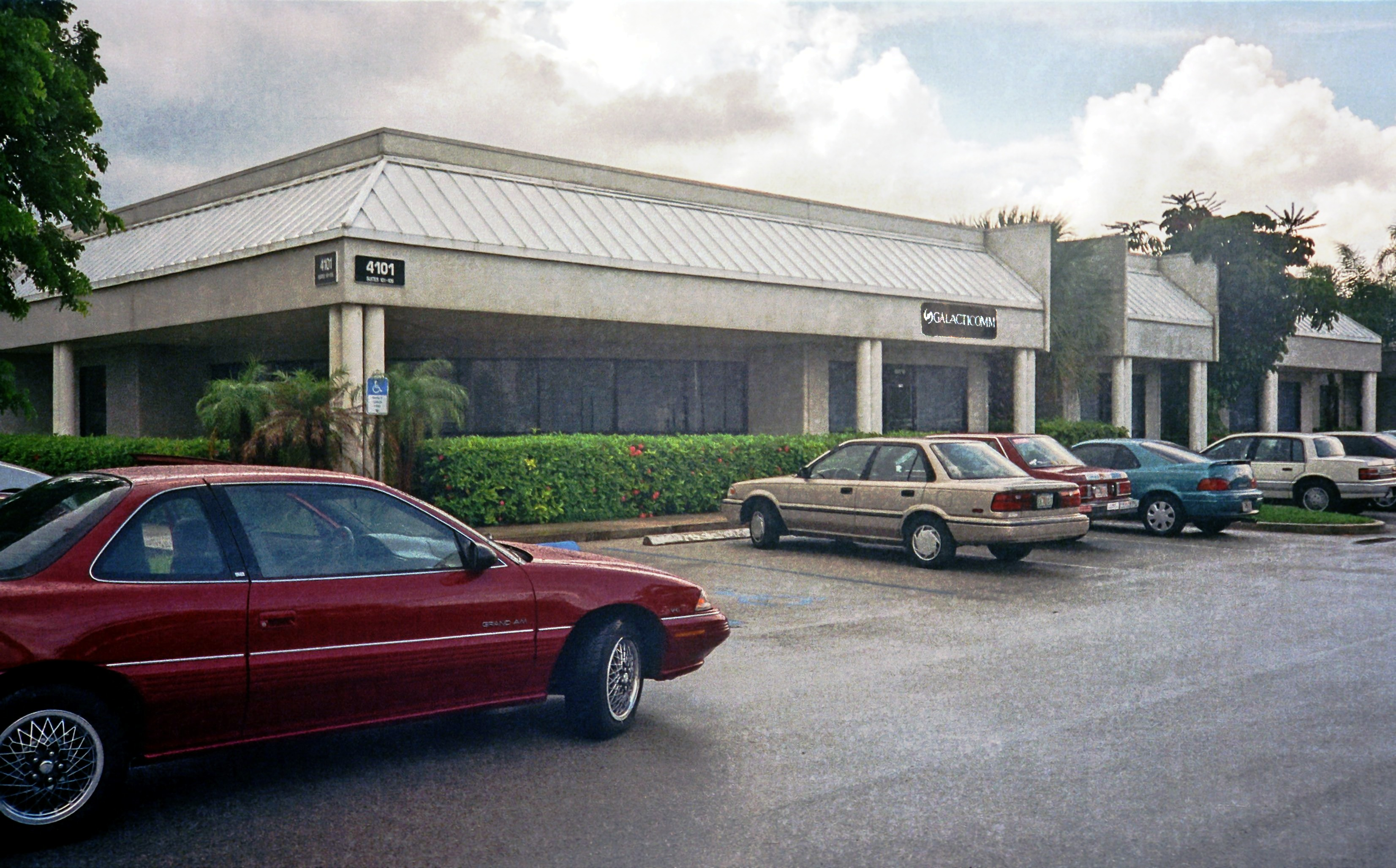
Galacticomm headquarters (4101 S.W. 47 Ave., Suite 101, Fort Lauderdale, FL) in August 1994

== History ==
The Major BBS was developed by Tim Stryker and launched in 1986 by Stryker's company, Galacticomm, Inc., as a demonstration of the abilities of the Galacticomm Software Breakthrough Library (or GSBL). The GSBL was a powerful set of assembler routines written for IBM and compatible PCs that allowed up to 32 simultaneous serial port or dialup connections to a single software instance without the need for an external multitasker. The "breakthrough" was that the library polled the serial ports, rather than allowing them to interrupt the processor, which was against the accepted wisdom of the time, and through use of polling and making use of the FIFO buffers that were by this time standard on UART chips, an - at the time - unheard of number of serial ports could be attached to a PC. Because interrupts were not used, there were no issues relating to interrupt conflicts on PC hardware of the day.

The GSBL was licensed to developers for varied uses, such as communications systems, bank systems, and real estate systems. Eventually, The Major BBS was enhanced enough that it became a marketable product in its own right. By late 1987, Galacticomm was licensing more copies of The Major BBS than the GSBL by itself. The GSBL continued to be enhanced, expanding to 64 users by 1988, then 256 by 1992, with The Major BBS's line capacity expanding as a result.

Because it was one of the few multi-line bulletin board systems, MBBS software was known for fostering online communities and an interactive online experience where users were able to interact with each other via Teleconference (chat rooms) and multiplayer games. This flexibility spawned a small industry of Independent Software Vendors (ISV) who began developing MBBS add-ons, which ranged from shopping malls (what would now be called shopping cart software) to online role playing games.

The Major BBS allowed incoming connections via modems on telephone lines, IPX networks, and X.25 packet-switched networks. In the mid-1990s, the offering expanded to include TCP/IP by the ISV Vircom, a Canadian company that has since become well known for its anti-spam/anti-virus software, shortly followed by Galacticomm's own TCP/IP add-on, the Internet Connection Option (ICO), which was derived from another ISV's offering.

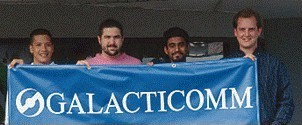
Developers and staff associated with the Unix versions of The Major BBS and Worldgroup at Galacticomm Technologies, circa 1994–1995.

In the mid-1990s, Galacticomm developed Unix-based versions of The Major BBS and Worldgroup in an effort to expand beyond DOS-based bulletin board systems and integrate Internet services. The Unix project originated from work by Mahesh Neelakanta and Ken Maier, who developed a prototype port of The Major BBS on Unix systems incorporating Internet email, Telnet, FTP, and shell account access. Following demonstrations of the prototype, Galacticomm established a dedicated Unix division to continue development.

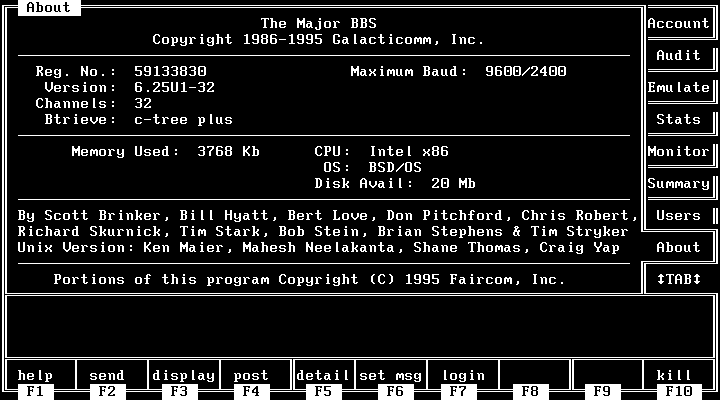
The Major BBS running on BSD/OS.

The Unix versions added TCP/IP networking capabilities and Internet-oriented features including sendmail integration, Usenet support, Telnet access, FTP services, and Network File System (NFS) support. Galacticomm promoted the Unix editions as scalable multi-user communications systems capable of supporting significantly more simultaneous users than the DOS-based version.

In 1992, the Major BBS was selected by the National Library of Medicine as the access mechanism for the Grateful Med medical journal system, just prior to universal access via the World Wide Web.

=== Worldgroup ===
Seeking to compete with America Online, Galacticomm extended The Major BBS software to communicate in a client–server model with a custom program. The MBBS software was renamed Worldgroup Server, and released in 1995 with the version number restarting at 1.0; the included user-side client software was named Worldgroup Manager (but sometimes known as Worldgroup Client) and ran in Microsoft Windows.

Version 3.0 in 1997, the first 32-bit version of Worldgroup Server, was released for Windows NT. Other versions, like the DOS compatible version continued in development simultaneously. Version 3.0 finally focused on an active HTML web community, after three years of concentrating on the original client–server strategy. Version 3.1 was the final version of the Worldgroup Server to support DOS.

=== Demise ===
Although Worldgroup initially had some success, the initial proprietary client/server model was an unfortunate strategic choice, as the World Wide Web was just emerging as a dominant phenomenon. The popularity of the text-terminal-based BBSes, as well as America Online's proprietary client model, faded as online use became web-oriented. Galacticomm's slow response in adapting to the web-based online model probably was fatal.

Founder Tim Stryker committed suicide on August 6, 1996, in Colorado, and the company was sold by his widow Christine to a group headed by Yannick Tessier, owner of Tessier Technologies, who developed software as an ISV. As Galacticomm Technologies, Inc., Tessier and Peter Berg led the company toward an initial public offering, which failed in 1998. The company discontinued operations in 1999 and was foreclosed upon by their primary lender; the lender acquired the company's assets through the foreclosure in 2002. The company's assets were purchased by an ISV from the bank in 2005.

== Timeline ==
- 1986: MajorBBS 1.0 — not released
- 1986: MajorBBS 2.0 — shareware
- 1987: MajorBBS 3.0 — commercial software
- 1988: MajorBBS 5.0
- 1989: MajorBBS 5.07
- 1990: MajorBBS 5.2
- 1991: MajorBBS 5.3 — includes Novell NetWare support
- 1992: MajorBBS 6.0 — included Phar Lap protected mode capability
- 1993: MajorBBS 6.1 — multilingual
- 1994: MajorBBS 6.25 — Internet Connection Option (ICO) TCP/IP; Unix version available
- 1995: Worldgroup 1.0 — introduced Microsoft Windows client; final Unix server version
- 1996: Worldgroup 2.0 — included plug-in for Netscape
- 1997: Worldgroup 3.0 — first server version for 32-bit Windows NT
- 1999: Galacticomm ends operations after failed IPO
- 2002: Galacticomm assets foreclosed upon by lender
- 2005: Galacticomm assets sold by lender to a current ISV

== Technical information ==
=== Software ===
- Initially, a system's linecount depended on the user limit of the GSBL purchased with the BBS. The GSBL (and thus the BBS) was offered in 2, 4, 8, 16, 32, or 64 user editions. Later, with the release of version 6, the concept of user six-packs was introduced. System operators (SysOps) purchased as many packs as they needed to add additional lines, up to 256.
- Due to a limitation of the 16-bit architecture of MS-DOS, Major BBS was limited to a maximum of 255 incoming lines (plus one 'local console'). In practice, it was extremely difficult to scale to this level due to the 16MB RAM limitation of the Phar Lap 286 memory extender in use, as well as the physical limitations on connecting 255 modems to a single computer.
- Developers were sold development kits that allowed add-ons to be written in C/C++
- All data files were stored using a Btrieve format.
- It was necessary for the system to go down for maintenance each evening in order to re-index data files as well as running the cleanup routines for the main system and its add-ons.

=== Hardware ===
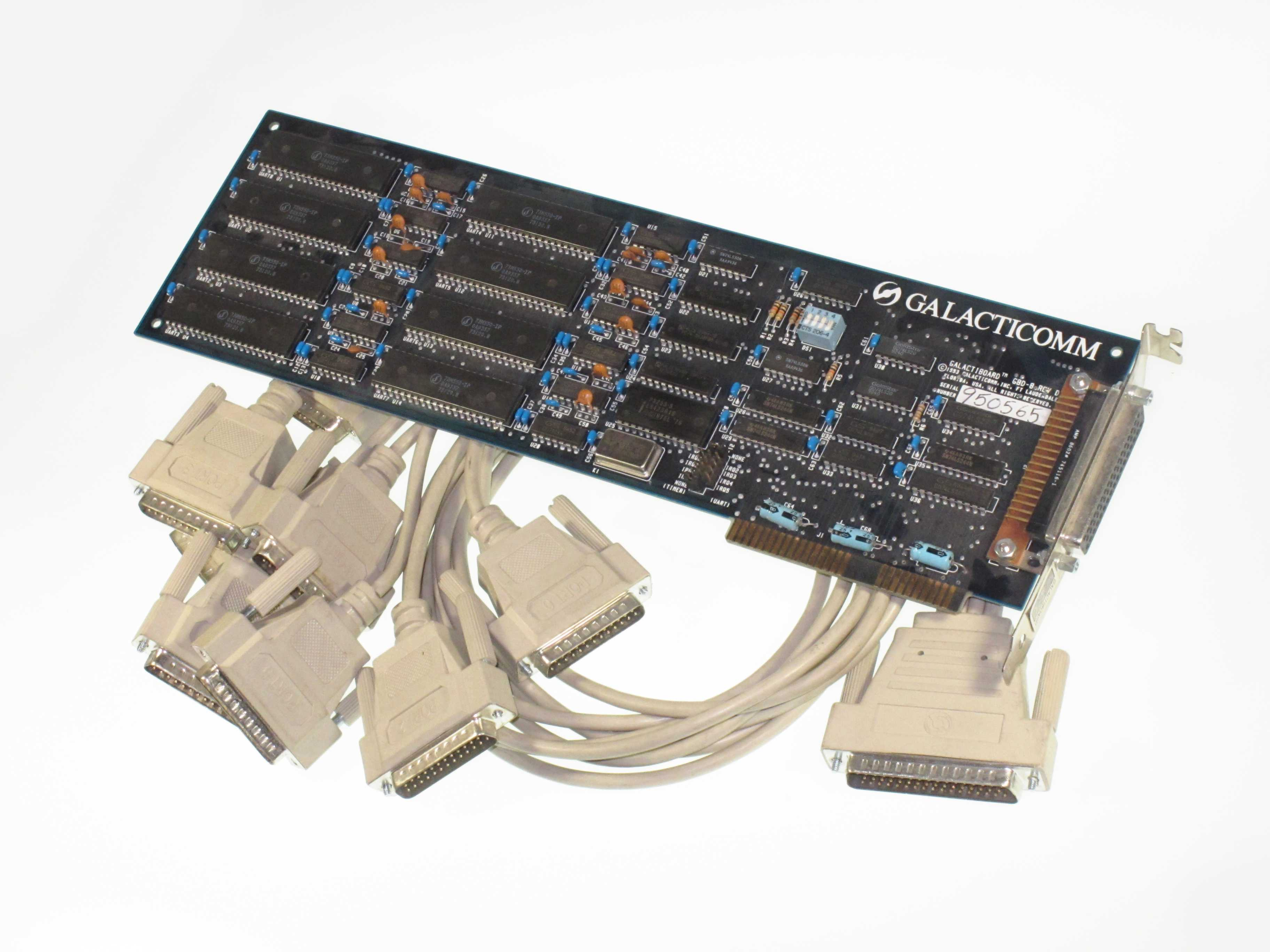
Galactiboard

MBBS ran on standard Intel PC hardware. However it relied on serial ports the number of which was limited to 4 by the standard PC/MS-DOS architecture. Therefore, Galacticomm provided some of their own hardware to increase the number of communication channels.

- Multi-line modem cards
- Galactiboard - an 8-port serial interface for connecting external modems
- Galactibox - a 16 slot extender that could house multiple Galactiboards and/or internal modem cards

== Add-on software ==
=== Connection add-ons ===
- Vircom TCP/IP — allowed the system to link to the Internet, provide both inbound and outbound FTP and Telnet services, and provide e-mail service. The add-on also allowed MajorBBS to provide dialup Internet access via SLIP and PPP. Vircom later went on to produce software solutions to combat spam.
- Vircom RADIUS — a RADIUS server which allowed MajorBBS to act as the central authentication and billing server for any number of applications such as Internet services.

=== Games ===
- Flash Attack
- Fazuul by Tim Stryker
- Quest for Magic by Scott Brinker and Tim Stryker (copyright held by Elwynor Technologies, source was previously released)
- Quest for Sorcery by Scott Brinker (source code missing, but rights held by Elwynor Technologies)
- Quest for Sorcery II by Scott Brinker (source code missing, but rights held by Elwynor Technologies)
- Quest of the Alchemists by Scott Brinker (currently owned by Elwynor Technologies)
- Kyrandia by Scott Brinker and Richard Skurnick
- Alchemy II: The Hangover by Scott Brinker (currently owned by Elwynor Technologies)
- Infinity Complex by Steve Neal (currently owned by Elwynor Technologies)
- MajorMUD by West Coast Creations (currently owned by Metropolis Gameport)
- Tele-Arena by Sean Ferrell
- Sub Striker by Tim Stark / Mark Enriquez [Magicomm]
- Tournament Backgammon by Mark Enriquez [Magicomm]
- Tele-Arena/II by Sean Ferrell (currently owned by Elwynor Technologies)
- Swords of Chaos by Mark Peterson (currently owned by Metropolis Gameport)
- Mutants by Majorware Inc.(currently owned by Metropolis Gameport)
- Phantasia by Ewe-Nique Creations (Bil Simser, based on Edward Estes UNIX version)
- Sceptre by Ewe-Nique Creations (Bil Simser)
- Trivia Party and Word Party by Ewe-Nique Creations (Bil Simser)
- Galactic Empire by Mike Murdock (DOS version maintained by Bil Simser)
- Galactiwars by Don Arnel/Logicom (currently owned by Elwynor Technologies)
- War of Worlds by Richard Skurnick (currently owned by Elwynor Technologies)
- Crossroads of the Elements by High Velocity Software
- Trade Wars 2002 by High Velocity Software and Martech/EIS
- Farwest Trivia/Tele-Trivia (currently owned by Datasafe (only DOS version owned by Metropolis Gameport))
- Lords of Cyberspace (currently owned by metropolis Gameport)
- Wilderlands/II by Wilderland Software (currently owned by Elwynor Technologies)
- Androids by Tim Stryker
- Hangman's Secret Cove by Galacticomm
- Super Nova by Galacticomm
- T-LORD by Robinson Technologies Inc
- Oltima 2000 by Tessier Technologies Inc
- Swords & Sorcery by Logicom Inc
- BladeMaster by Logicom Inc
- CyberTank by InfiNetwork
- Foodfight by Jabberwocky Inc
- Teleconference Trivia by Jabberwocky Inc
- RingMasters by InfiNetwork
- Archery by GWW
- The Casino by Logicom Inc
- Forbidden Lands Book I: The City of Falchon by Computel
- Forbidden Lands Book II: The Vale of Grimyre by Computel
- Forbidden Lands Book III: The Islands of Dawn by Computel

== International Versions ==
=== German ===
- A German version of The Major BBS was published by ONLINE STORE AG in Liechtenstein.
- A German version of Worldgroup was published by ONLINE STORE AG in Liechtenstein.

=== Spanish ===
- A Spanish version of The Major BBS was published
