= Event Horizons BBS =

Event Horizons BBS was a popular and perhaps the most financially successful Bulletin Board System (BBS). It was founded in 1983 by Jim Maxey, a self-taught scientist, who was President and CEO and ran his company out of Lake Oswego, Oregon. By 1993, the BBS was grossing over $3.2 million annually. In 1994, the BBS had 128 phone lines and over 34,000 members, and eighteen employees. The organization also offered mail-ordered copies of content for those that did not want to download said via modem. Event Horizons in later years ran on the TBBS system. In 1996, Maxey closed the BBS.

Event Horizons BBS originally offered online forums, games, and astronomy images for paying customers to download. Maxey first charged $1/hr which grew over the years to $24/hr. The BBS later offered softcore adult images and movies which helped to secure its fame as the most profitable BBS. Maxey and his team of programmers working for the BBS created an interactive, graphical game called Voyager III that allowed the players to explore space.

In 1992, Playboy Enterprises sued Event Horizons for copyright infringement. Maxey reportedly paid Playboy a half million dollars to settle the case out of court in 1993. The BBS complied with copyright law in the wake of the settlement.
