= Event Horizon (album) =

Studio album by I Am I
- Released: 26 May 2012
- Recorded: 4 December 2011 - 2 March 2012
- Genre: Heavy metal, power metal, AOR
- Length: 45:42
- Label: ZeePeeTee, Avalon
- Producer: Lior Stein

Event Horizon is the only studio album by British heavy metal band I Am I, released in 2012. It was originally released on USB, then onto CD format, making I Am I the first heavy metal band ever to release an album only on USB first. The album has a few traces of the power metal sound of ZP Theart's previous band DragonForce. It has been described as "old school meets new school" by lead vocalist and co-writer ZP Theart. The album is quite melodic and a bit similar to the AOR of the 1970s and 1980s. The lyrics deal with human emotions, social life, and issues that people struggle with.

== Track listing ==
The USB limited-edition version contained a set of bonus wallpapers, pictures of the band, music video for "Silent Genocide" and the trailer for the album. Later versions (2014 and onwards) also contained the singles "See You Again" and "You're the Voice", alongside the music video for "See You Again", without the trailer for the album.

All lyrics written by ZP Theart and all music composed by Jacob Ziemba, except where noted.

No.	Title	Lyrics	Length
1.	"This is My Life"		5:52
2.	"Silent Genocide"		4:24
3.	"Stay a While"		3:56
4.	"Cross the Line"	Ziemba	4:32
5.	"In the Air Tonight"		3:42
6.	"King in Ruins"		4:44
7.	"Kiss of Judas"		6:24
8.	"Inside of Me" (Japanese bonus track)		4:29
9.	"Dust 2 Dust"		4:04
10.	"Wasted Wonders"		3:38
11.	"Pave the Way"		4:42

=== USB limited edition bonus tracks ===
Non-album singles were included in the USB in a separate "singles" folder.

You're the Voice (single)
No.	Title	Writer(s)	Length
1.	"You're the Voice" (John Farnham cover)	Andy Qunta; Keith Reid; Maggie Ryder; Chris Thompson	4:33

See You Again (single)
No.	Title	Lyrics	Music	Length
1.	"See You Again"	Theart	Sarann Boo	4:31

== Personnel ==
- ZP Theart – vocals
- Jacob Ziemba – guitar
- Neil Salmon – bass
- Paul Clark Jr. – drums

Production

- Produced by Lior Stein
