= Meridian Mail =

Meridian Mail is one of the early all-digital voicemail systems, running on Meridian1 / SL-1 digital PBX systems from Northern Telecom (later known as Nortel).

In the early 1980s Northern Telecom introduced the Norstar. The Norstar was the first all-digital system suitable for small-sized offices (up to 192 lines), and became one of their major product lines.

The Norstar is powered by a 16 MHz Motorola 68000, and uses only a fraction of the CPU's power. Nortel executives were interested in finding ways to use that excess power, as long as their customers paid for the privilege. Nortel asked their research arm, Bell Northern Research (BNR), to look for ways to spend those cycles. Meridian Mail was developed as a result.

Meridian Mail was discontinued by Nortel, and has been replaced by CallPilot, which in fact uses the same features and codes as Meridian Mail, but unlike Meridian Mail, allows newer features such as Unified Messaging. Unlike older Nortel systems, where the Meridian PBXs were assigned Meridian Mail and the Norstar systems were assigned Norstar VoiceMail or Startalk Flash VoiceMail, CallPilot was branded for both the Communication Servers PBX and Business Communication Manager Hybrid/Key telephone systems.

CallPilot is one of the products acquired by Avaya in their purchase of Nortel Enterprise Solutions in 2009.

== See also ==
- Unified messaging
- LANstar - Northern Telecom's foray into twisted-pair PC networking
