= Randy Suess =

American computer programmer

Randy John Suess (January 27, 1945 – December 10, 2019) was the co-founder of the CBBS bulletin board, the first bulletin board system (BBS) ever brought online. Suess, along with collaborator Ward Christensen, whom he met when they were both members of the Chicago Area Computer Hobbyists’ Exchange, or CACHE, started development of CBBS during a blizzard in Chicago, Illinois, and officially established it four weeks later, on February 16, 1978.

== Biography ==
Suess was born in Skokie, Illinois, to Miland, a police officer, and Ruth (née Duppenthaler), a nurse. He served in the Navy, and afterward, attended the University of Illinois at Chicago Circle. Suess worked at IBM and Zenith.

Suess put together the hardware which supported CBBS, while Christensen built the software, which was automatically loaded whenever someone dialed in. Suess also hosted CBBS, because his home in the Wrigleyville section of Chicago could be called without paying long-distance charges by anyone in Chicago. By the time they retired the system in the 1980s, its single phone line had received more than half a million calls. There is still at least one active CBBS system as of August 2020.

In the 1970s, Suess was also an amateur radio operator, using the call sign WB9GPM. He was an active member of the Chicago FM Club, where he helped with maintenance on their extensive radio repeater systems.

In 1992, Suess and Christensen received a Dvorak Telecommunications Excellence Award for their development of the first BBS.

In May 2005, Suess and Christensen were both featured in BBS: The Documentary.

Suess died on December 10, 2019, in Chicago, Illinois.
