= CBBS =

Early online bulletin board system (created 1978)

Splashscreen of the CBBS/Chicago (1978)

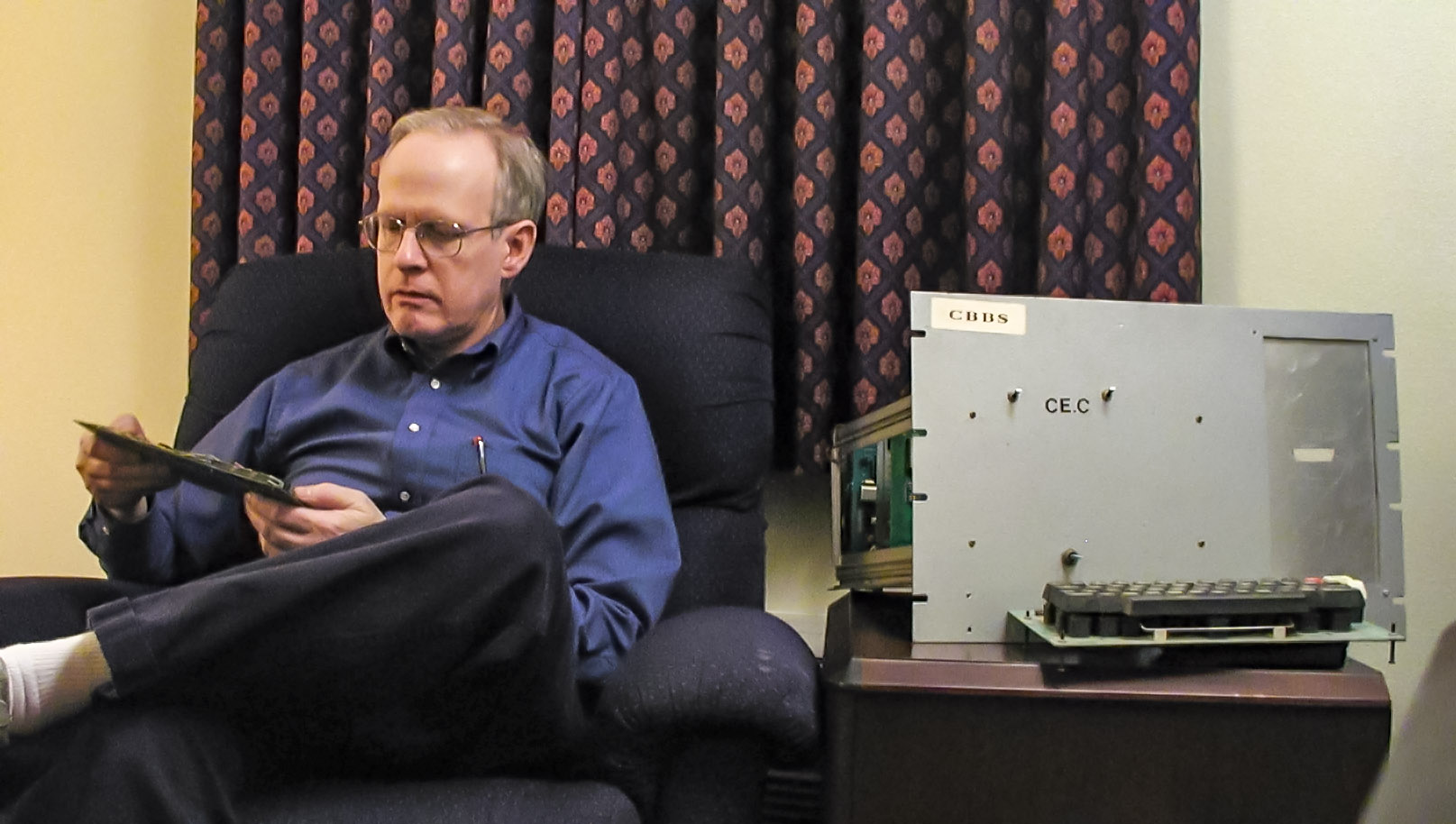
Ward Christensen and the CBBS (2005)

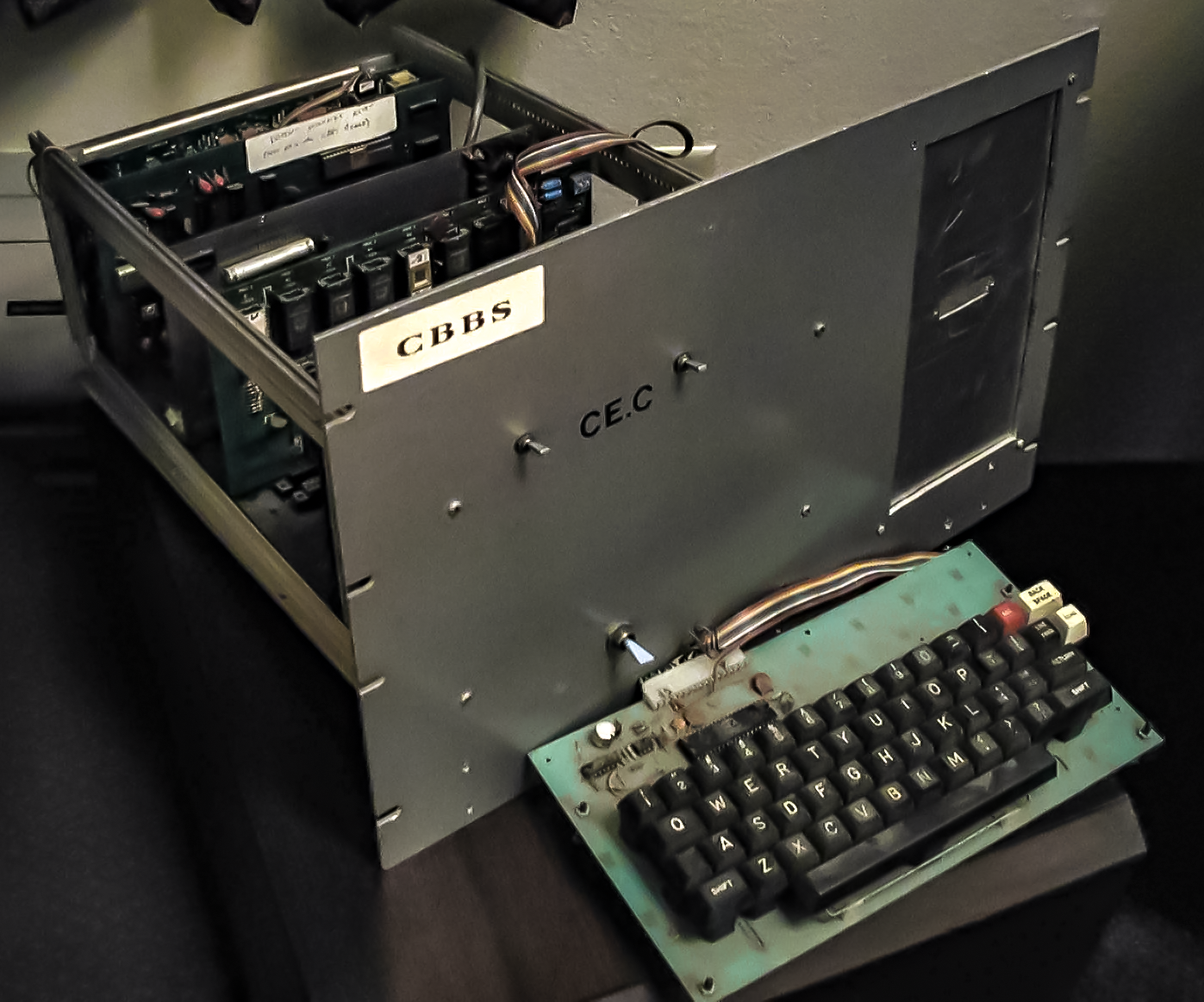
The first S-100 Hardware of the CBBS/Chicago (2005)

CBBS ("Computerized Bulletin Board System") was a computer program and homebrew hardware created by Ward Christensen and Randy Suess to allow them and other computer hobbyists to exchange information between each other.

In January 1978, Chicago was hit by the Great Blizzard of 1978, which dumped record amounts of snow throughout the Midwest. Among those caught in the storm were Christensen and Suess, who were members of CACHE, the Chicago Area Computer Hobbyists' Exchange. They had met at that computer club in the mid-1970s and become friends.

Christensen had created a file transfer protocol for sending binary computer files through modem connections, which was called, simply, MODEM. Later improvements to the program motivated a name change into the now familiar XMODEM. The success of this project encouraged further experiments. CACHE members frequently shared programs and had long been discussing some form of file transfer using modems, and Christensen was naturally at the center of these discussions; however, Suess in particular was skeptical of accomplishing such a project by a volunteer committee. Christensen and Suess became enamored of the extended idea of creating a computerized answering machine and message center, which would allow members to call in with their then-new modems and leave announcements for upcoming meetings.

However, they needed some quiet time to set aside for such a project, and the blizzard gave them that time. Christensen worked on the software and Suess cobbled together an S-100 computer to put the program on. They had a working version within two weeks, but claimed soon afterwards that it had taken four so that it wouldn't seem like a "rushed" project. Time and tradition have settled that date to be February 16, 1978. Christensen and Suess described their innovation in an article entitled "Hobbyist Computerized Bulletin Board" in the November 1978 issue of Byte magazine.

Because the Internet was not yet operational and would not be available to most computer users for many years, users had to dial CBBS directly using a modem. Also because the CBBS hardware and software supported only a single modem for most of its existence, users had to take turns accessing the system, each hanging up when done to let someone else have access. Despite these limitations, the system was seen as very useful, and ran for many years and inspired the creation of many other bulletin board systems. Ward & Randy would often watch the users while they were online and comment or go into chat if the subject warranted. At times, online users wondered if Ward & Randy actually existed.

The program had many forward thinking ideas, now accepted as canonical in the creation of message bases or "forums".

As Christensen and Suess went their separate ways, the CBBS name lived on, and survives to an extent as a web-based forum on Suess' website, chinet.com. Christensen's version of CBBS, called "Ward's Board", closed in the early 1990s.

On February 16, 2003, Chicago's Mayor Richard M. Daley declared the day "BBS" day in honor of the world's first BBS being created 25 years ago that day. An article with a photo of Ward and the CBBS hardware appeared shortly thereafter in the Chicago Tribune.

There is still at least one active CBBS system as of August 2020.

== See also ==
- Bulletin board system
