= List of English words of Korean origin =

This is a list of words of Korean origin which have entered into English usage. One metric for determining this is whether they appear in mainstream English language dictionaries.

== General ==
Word	Korean word	Explanation	Merriam-Webster	Oxford	Remarks
Chaebol	jaebeol 재벌 (財閥)	a large, usually family-owned, business group in South Korea (cognate with Japanese Zaibatsu)	✓	✓	
Hangul	hangeul 한글	Korean alphabet	✓	✗	
Jeonse	jeonse 전세 (傳貰)	a long-held renting arrangement where tenants pay lump-sum deposit for usually two years	✗	✗	
Korea	Goryeo 고려 (高麗)	a historic dynasty of Korea (see Names of Korea)	✓	✓	
Won	won 원 (圓)	the basic monetary unit of North and South Korea	✓	✓	

== Culture and martial arts ==
Word	Korean word	Explanation	Merriam-webster	Oxford	Remarks
Hapkido	hapgido 합기도 (合氣道)	a Korean martial art	✓	✓	
Kisaeng	gisaeng 기생 (妓生)	(archaic) a female entertainer who pours drinks to guests and entertain them with songs and dances	✓	✓	
Manhwa	manhwa 만화 (漫畫)	a style of Korean comic books, cartoons and animated cartoons (cognate with Japanese manga)	✗	✓	
Mukbang	meokbang 먹방	an online broadcast in which a host eats food while interacting with the audience	✗	✗	
Ondol	ondol 온돌 (溫突/溫堗)	a system of underfloor heating	✗	✓	
Sijo	sijo 시조 (時調)	an unrhymed three-verse poem (usually in six shorter lines in English translations)	✓	✗	
Taekwondo	taegwondo 태권도 (跆拳道)	a Korean martial art	✓	✓	

== Food ==
Word	Korean word	Explanation	Merriam-webster	Oxford	Remarks
Bibimbap	bibimbap 비빔밥	a dish of rice topped with sautéed vegetables, meat, egg, and chilli paste	✓	✓	
Bulgogi	bulgogi 불고기	a dish of thin beef slices marinated and grilled on a barbecue	✓	✓	
Galbi	galbi 갈비	a dish of beef or pork ribs marinated and grilled on a barbecue	✗	✗	
Gochujang	gochu-jang 고추장	Korean red chili paste	✓	✓	
Kimchi	gimchi 김치	a vegetable pickle that is the national dish of Korea	✓	✓	
Makkoli	makgeolli 막걸리	an alcoholic drink made from fermented rice	✗	✓	
Soju	soju 소주 (燒酒)	a distilled liquor, usually made from rice or sweet potatoes	✓	✓	

== Clothing ==
Word	Korean word	Explanation	Merriam-Webster	Oxford	Remarks
Hanbok	hanbok 한복 (韓服)	traditional Korean clothes	✗	✓	

== Ideology and religion ==
Word	Korean word	Explanation	Merriam-Webster	Oxford	Remarks
Moonie	Mun Seonmyeong 문선명 (文鮮明)	a member of the Unification Church, founded by Sun Myung Moon	✓	✓	
Juche	juche sasang 주체사상 (主體思想)	a political thesis formed by the former North Korean leader Kim Il Sung which states that the Korean masses are the masters of the country's development	✗	✗	
Songbun	seongbun 성분 (成分)	a system of ascribed status used in North Korea, based on the political, social, and economic background of one's direct ancestors as well as the behavior of their relatives	✗	✗	

== Other ==
Word	Korean word	Explanation	Merriam-Webster	Oxford	Remarks
Chobo	chobo 초보 (初步)	a novice	✗	✗	
Gangnam	gangnam 강남 (江南)	a regional district of Seoul popularized by 2012 chart topping single Gangnam Style by Psy	✗	✗	
Gosu	gosu 고수 (高手)	a person with great skill	✗	✗	
Hantaan virus	Hantan-gang 한탄강 (漢灘江)	a virus species transmitted by rodents (The rodents carrying the virus were collected near Hantan River.)	✓	✓	
Hantavirus	Hantan-gang 한탄강 (漢灘江)	a genus of viruses transmitted by rodents (The rodents carrying the virus were collected near Hantan River.)	✓	✓	
Hwabyeong	hwabyeong 화병 (火病)	a mental illness occurring when anger builds up in the mind without being vented	✗	✗	
Minjung	minjung 민중 (民衆)	the mass of the people (See also: minjung theology and minjung art)	✗	✗	

== See also ==
- Lists of English loanwords by country or language of origin
