= Leet =

Online slang and alternative orthography

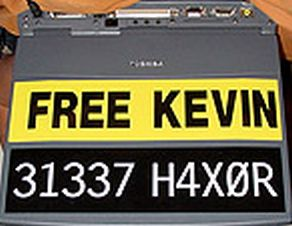
An "eleet hacker" (31337 H4XØR) laptop sticker, along with a "Free Kevin" sticker

Leet (or "1337"), also known as eleet, leetspeak, or simply hacker speech, is a system of modified spellings used primarily on the Internet. It often uses character replacements in ways that play on the similarity of their glyphs via reflection or other resemblance. Additionally, it modifies certain words on the basis of a system of suffixes and alternative meanings. There are many dialects or linguistic varieties in different online communities.

The term leet is derived from the word elite, used as an adjective to describe skill or accomplishment, especially in the fields of online gaming and computer hacking. The leet lexicon includes spellings of the word as 1337 or leet.

== History ==
Leet originated within bulletin board systems (BBS) in the 1980s, where having "elite" status on a BBS allowed a user access to file folders, games, and special chat rooms. The Cult of the Dead Cow hacker collective has been credited with the original coining of the term, in their text-files of that era. One theory is that it was developed to defeat text filters created by BBS or Internet Relay Chat system operators for message boards to discourage the discussion of forbidden topics, like cracking and hacking.

Once reserved for hackers, crackers, and script kiddies, leet later entered the mainstream. Some consider emoticons and ASCII art, like smiley faces, to be leet, while others maintain that leet consists of only symbolic word obfuscation. More obscure forms of leet, involving the use of symbol combinations and almost no letters or numbers, continue to be used for its original purpose of obfuscated communication. It is also sometimes used as a scripting language. Variants of leet have been used to evade censorship for many years; for instance "@$$" (ass) and "$#!+" (shit) are frequently seen to make a word appear censored to the untrained eye but obvious to a person familiar with leet. This enables coders and programmers especially to circumvent filters and speak about topics that would usually get banned. "Hacker" would end up as "H4x0r", for example.

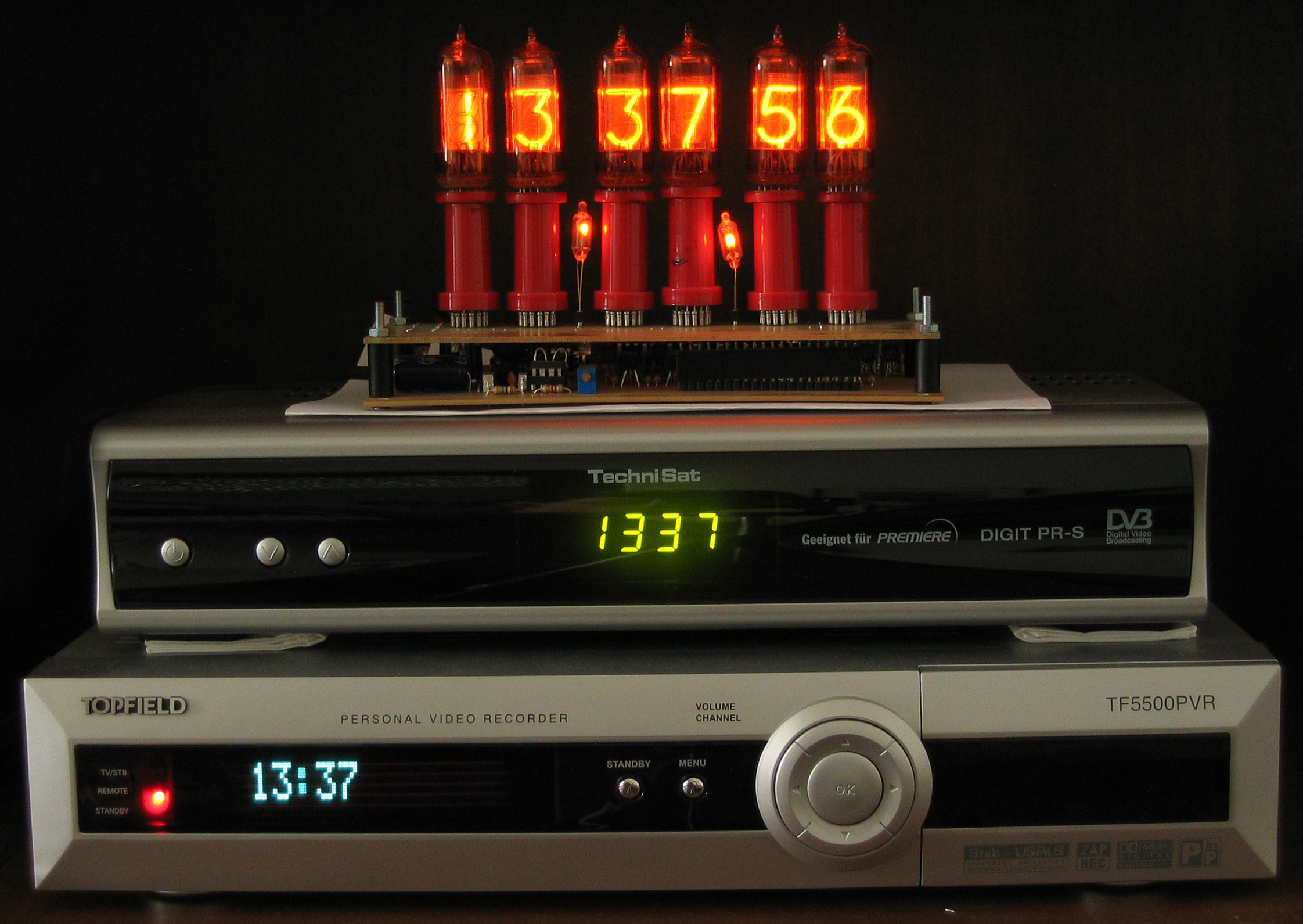
Various display devices showing 1337

Leet symbols, especially the number 1337, are Internet memes that have spilled over into some culture. Signs that show the numbers "1337" are popular motifs for pictures and are shared widely across the Internet.

=== Algospeak ===
Algospeak (a portmanteau of algorithm and speak) shares conceptual similarities with leet, particularly in their primary purpose of circumventing algorithmic censorship online. These are euphemisms that aim to evade automated online moderation techniques, especially those that are considered unfair or hindering free speech. Prominent examples include use of the term "unalive" as a softened version of "kill" or "suicide", and "seggs" in place of "sex". These phrases are readily understood as euphemisms, providing either the same general meaning, pronunciation, or shape of the original word. Algospeak is employed as a contemporary alternative to leet. The approach has gained more popularity in 2023 and 2024 with pro-Palestinian social media users as the Gaza war intensified, in order to circumvent algorithms used by platforms such as Meta and TikTok.

== Orthography ==
One of the hallmarks of leet is its unique approach to orthography, using substitutions of other letters, or indeed of characters other than letters, to represent letters in a word. For more casual use of leet, the primary strategy is to use quasi-homoglyphs, symbols that closely resemble (to varying degrees) the letters for which they stand.

The choice of symbol is not fixed: anything the reader can make sense of is valid in leet-speak. Sometimes, a gamer would work around a nickname being already taken (and maybe abandoned as well) by replacing a letter with a similar-looking digit.

- However, leet is also seen in situations where the argot (i.e., secret language) characteristics of the system are required, either to exclude newbies or outsiders in general, meaning that anything that the average reader cannot make sense of is valid; a valid reader should themselves try to make sense, if deserving of the underlying message.
- Mild leet can be used to mess with frequency analysis "as is".

Another use for leet orthographic substitutions is the creation of paraphrased passwords. Limitations imposed by websites on password length (usually no more than 36) and the characters permitted (e.g. alphanumeric and symbols) require less extensive forms when used in this application.

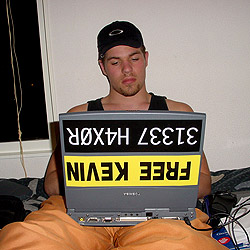
The same sticker on one's laptop demonstrates "ㄥƐƐƖƐ" (upside-down "31337") as "Eleet"

Some examples of leet orthography include:

- B1ff – "BIFF", a stereotypical newcoming user to Usenet.
- n00b or n008 – a term for "noob", the stereotypical newbie.
- The l33t programming language.
- "E5C4P3": stylized cover of Journey's Escape album.
- k3w1 deciphers as "kewl" (which is derived from "cool").
- The web-comics Megatokyo and Homestuck contain characters who speak variations of leet.
- The digit "5" in the stage name of musician Deadmau5.
- "DEF 4L7" plates are used by Defalt (sic), a hacker from the Watch Dogs videogame (the first in the series). "DefAlt" nickname is a possible reference to "default [settings]"
- Upside-down "1337" (with a bar under "1") also reads as "LEET" (see example on the photo).
- "1 (4/\/"7 |_|/\/[)3|2574/\/[) '/0|_||2 \/\/|2171/\/9.17'5 (0/\/|=|_|51/\/9" is heavily leet-styled "I can't understand your writing. It's confusing".
- Sometimes, a word can be typed in leet with digits only:
  - "360" codes the word "EGO" in leet;
  - "1057" is a way to spell "lost",
    - "106157", however, unfolds as "logist";
  - "2013" or "12013" somewhat resembles "ROLE" noun;
  - "2077" can be found in the logo of "Zott" German dairy company .
  - "11363015" reads as LIEGEOIS, e.g. "from Liège";
  - "2341" is a trick to spell leet variant of "REAL" word by putting items numbered from 1 to 4 in an alternative order.
  - "4150" allows to obfuscate "ALSO";
  - "137 17 83 137 17 60" conceals the phrase "let it be, let it go";
  - "231474813" is an encoding of the word "RELATABLE";
  - "33571 – 18124" translates to "Eesti – Ibiza";
  - "54807463" holds semblance to "SABOTAGE";
  - "45724" may emerge as a synonym for "ASTRA"
  - "411 23537" may stand for "ALL RESET".
  - "6302614" input outputs "GEORGIA"
- Sometimes words or phrases with 6 letters can be leet-ified into a valid hexadecimal color code:
  - █ "614D05" is a valid HEX-code for a dark shade of gold color, referencing GLaDOS;
  - █ "572E55" (or █ "572355") is a dark purple color, coming from the word "STRESS";
  - █ "1C373A" is a dark cyan ("icy") color, derived from "ICE TEA";
  - █ "C47C47" is a peach-orange color, derived from the word cat twice;
  - █ "C01025" is a pink-ish shade of red, derived from the word "COLORS";
  - █ "D35327" is a dark orange color, produced from "DESERT";
  - █ "80771E" is a yellowish-orange color, produced from "BOTTLE";
  - █ "B00B15" is a redish color, derived from "BOOBIE";
  - █ "B4DD1E" is a yellowish-green color, produced from "BADDIE".
- It is possible to spell words and names in leet-speak to create additional references.
  - For example, the name "Marisa" can be spelled as /\/\AR15/\ – with a reference to the AR-15 platform.
  - 834-613 means BEA-GLE all while also referencing to the Beagle Boys and their names (e.g. 6-digit IDs) in particular.
  - 2017Δ1337 is a reference to Colt Delta Elite, where "2017" stands for "Qolt" (derived from "Colt") and "1337" bears aforementioned "Elite" meaning.
  - "2007 2008" deciphers as "QOOT QOOB" which is derived from "cute cube", referencing Compation Cube from Portal.

However, leetspeak should not be confused with SMS-speak, characterized by using "4" as "for", "2" as "to", "b&" as "ban'd" (i.e. "banned"), "gr8 b8, m8, appreci8, no h8" as "great bait, mate, appreciate, no hate", and so on.

=== Table of leet-speak substitutes for normal letters ===
A	B	C	D	E	F	G	H	I	J	K	L	M	N	O	P	Q	R	S	T	U	V	W	X	Y	Z
a 4 /\ @^ (L; Д Λ	b I3; 8; 13 |3 ß !3 (3 /3)3 |-] j3 ฿|З	c [ ¢ < ( © ㄈ	d) |) (| [); I> |> ? T); I7 cl |} |] l); I); Đ	e 3 ヨ & £ € [- |=-	f |= ƒ |# ph /= v	g 6 & (_+ 9 C- gee (?, [, {, <- (.	h # /-/ \-\ [-] ]-[)-( (-) :-: |~| |-| ]~[ }{ !-! 1-1 \-/ I+I |ー| ㅐ	i 1 | ][ ! eye 3y3 江 エ	j,_| _|._|._] _],_] ] _|	k >| |< 1< |c |( 7<	l 1; 7; 2 £ |_ ㄥ |	m /\/\ /V\ [V] |\/| ΛΛ^^ <\/> {V} (v) (V) |\|\ ]\/[ nn 11; 111 ᱬ |V| /|/| ៣	n^/ |\| /\/ [\] <\> {\} /V^ ท И ㄇ 11	o 0 () oh [] p <> Ø ㄖ	p |* |o |º ? |^ |> |"; 9 []D |° |7 |0 ⁋ ₽ ㄗ	q (_,) ()_; 2; 0_ <| & 9 ¶ ⁋ ℗ °| 0|	r I2; 9 |` |~ |? /2 |^ lz l2 7; 2; 12 ® [z Я.- |2 |- 3; 4	s 5 $ z § ehs es 2 ㄎ ខ	t 7 + -|- '][' † «|» ~|~ ㄒ	u (_) |_| v L| บ ㄩ	v \/ |/ \|	w \/\/ |/\| vv \N '// \\' \^/ \/\/ (n) \V/ \X/ \|/ \_|_/ \_:_/ uu VV |Λ| 2u \\//\\// พ ฟ ผ ฬ យ ₩ ᱦ ω /> 2v	x >< }{ ecks × ? }{)( ][ ㄨ χ	y j `/ \|/ ¥ \// ㄚ `|΄	z 2; 7_ -/_ % >_ s ~/_ -\_ -|_ ζ

== Morphology ==
Text rendered in leet is often characterized by distinctive, recurring forms.

-xor suffix
The meaning of this suffix is parallel with the English -er and -or suffixes (seen in hacker and lesser) in that it derives agent nouns from a verb stem. It is realized in two different forms: -xor and -zor, /-sɔːr/ and /-zɔːr/, respectively. For example, the first may be seen in the word hax(x)or (H4x0r in leet) /ˈhæksɔːr/ and the second in pwnzor /ˈoʊnzɔːr/. Additionally, this nominalization may also be inflected with all of the suffixes of regular English verbs. The letter 'o' is often replaced with the numeral 0.
-age suffix
Derivation of a noun from a verb stem is possible by attaching -age to the base form of any verb. Attested derivations are pwnage, skillage, and speakage. However, leet provides exceptions; the word leetage is acceptable, referring to actively being leet. These nouns are often used with a form of "to be" rather than "to have," e.g., "that was pwnage" rather than "he has pwnage". Either is a more emphatic way of expressing the simpler "he pwns", but the former implies that the person is embodying the trait rather than merely possessing it.
-ness suffix
Derivation of a noun from an adjective stem is done by attaching -ness to any adjective. This is entirely the same as the English form, except it is used much more often in Leet. Nouns such as lulzness and leetness are derivations using this suffix.
Words ending in -ed
When forming a past participle ending in -ed, the Leet user may replace the -e with an apostrophe, as was common in poetry of previous centuries, (e.g. "pwned" becomes "pwn'd"). Sometimes, the apostrophe is removed as well (e.g. "pwned" becomes "pwnd"). The word ending may also be substituted by -t (e.g. pwned becomes pwnt).
Use of the -& suffix
Words ending in -and, -anned, -ant, or a similar sound can sometimes be spelled with an ampersand (&) to express the ending sound (e.g. "This is the s&box", "I'm sorry, you've been b&", "&hill/&farm"). It is most commonly used with the word banned. An alternative form of "B&" is "B7", as the ampersand is with the "7" key on the standard US keyboard. It is often seen in the abbreviation "IBB7" (in before banned), which indicates that the poster believes that a previous poster will soon be banned from the site, channel, or board on which they are posting.

== Grammar ==
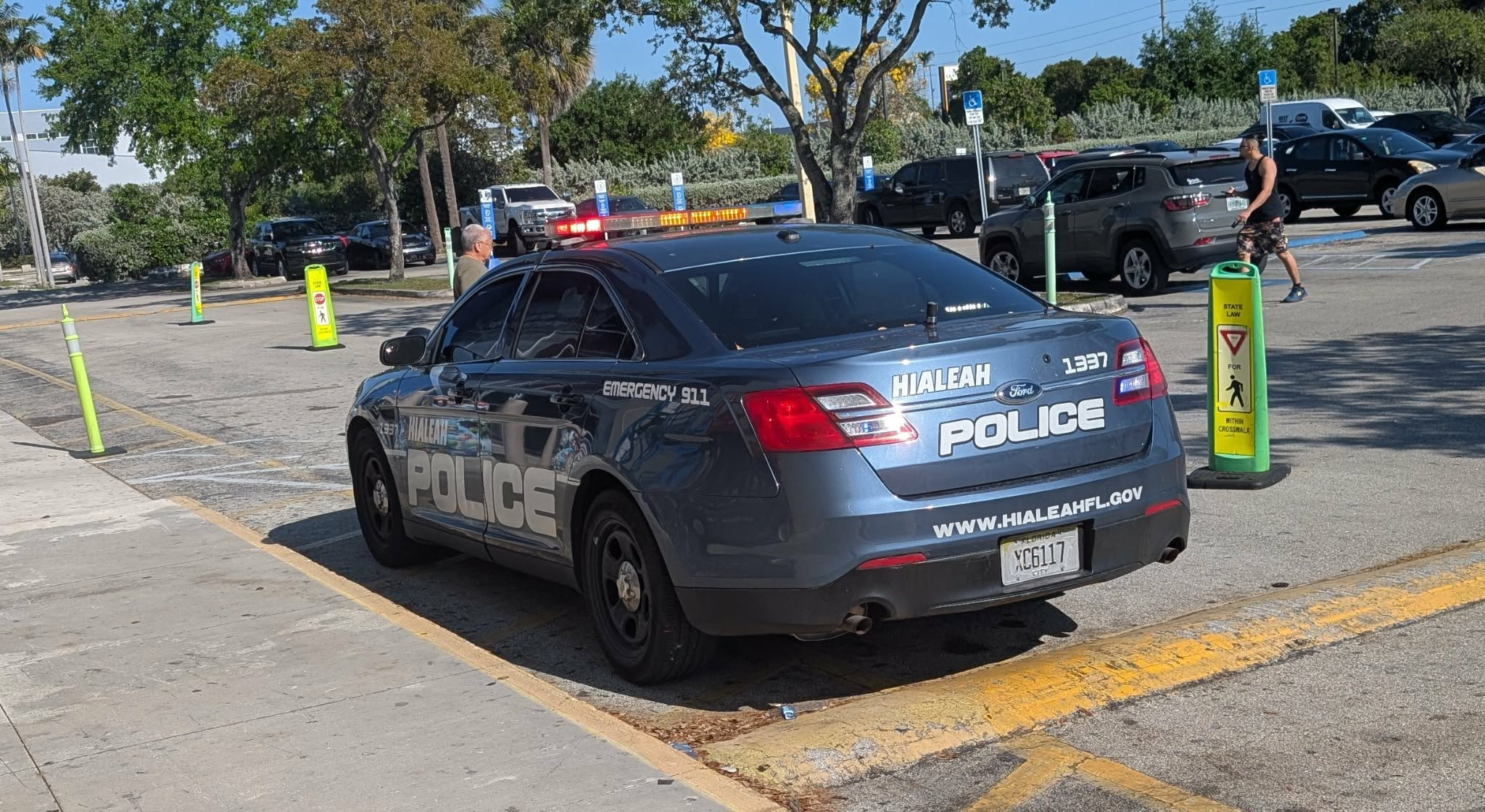
Police car in Hialeah, FL showing number 1337

Leet can be pronounced as a single syllable, /ˈliːt/, rhyming with eat, by way of apheresis of the initial vowel of "elite". It may also be pronounced as two syllables, /ɛˈliːt/. In particular, speakers of leet are fond of verbing nouns, turning verbs into nouns (and back again) as forms of emphasis, e.g. "Austin rocks" is weaker than "Austin roxxorz" (note spelling), which is weaker than "Au5t1N is t3h r0xx0rz" (note grammar), which is weaker than something like "0MFG D00D /\Ü571N 15 T3H l_l83Я 1337 Я0XX0ЯZ" (OMG, dude, Austin is the über-elite rocks-er!). In essence, all of these mean "Austin rocks," not necessarily the other options. Added words and misspellings add to the speaker's enjoyment. Leet, like hacker slang, employs analogy in construction of new words. For example, if haxored is the past tense of the verb "to hack" (hack → haxor → haxored), then winzored would be easily understood to be the past tense conjugation of "to win," even if the reader had not seen that particular word before.

"1337" represented in both binary and alternate mark inversion

Leet has its own colloquialisms, many of which originated as jokes based on common typing errors, habits of new computer users, or knowledge of cyberculture and history. Leet is not solely based upon one language or character set. Greek, Russian, and other languages have leet forms, and leet in one language may use characters from another where they are available. As such, while it may be referred to as a "cipher", a "dialect", or a "language", leet does not fit squarely into any of these categories. The term leet itself is often written 31337, or 1337, and many other variations. After the meaning of these became widely familiar, 10100111001 came to be used in its place, because it is the binary form of 1337 decimal, making it more of a puzzle to interpret. An increasingly common characteristic of leet is the changing of grammatical usage so as to be deliberately incorrect. The widespread popularity of deliberate misspelling is similar to the cult following of the "All your base are belong to us" phrase. Indeed, the online and computer communities have been international from their inception, so spellings and phrases typical of non-native speakers are quite common.

== Vocabulary ==
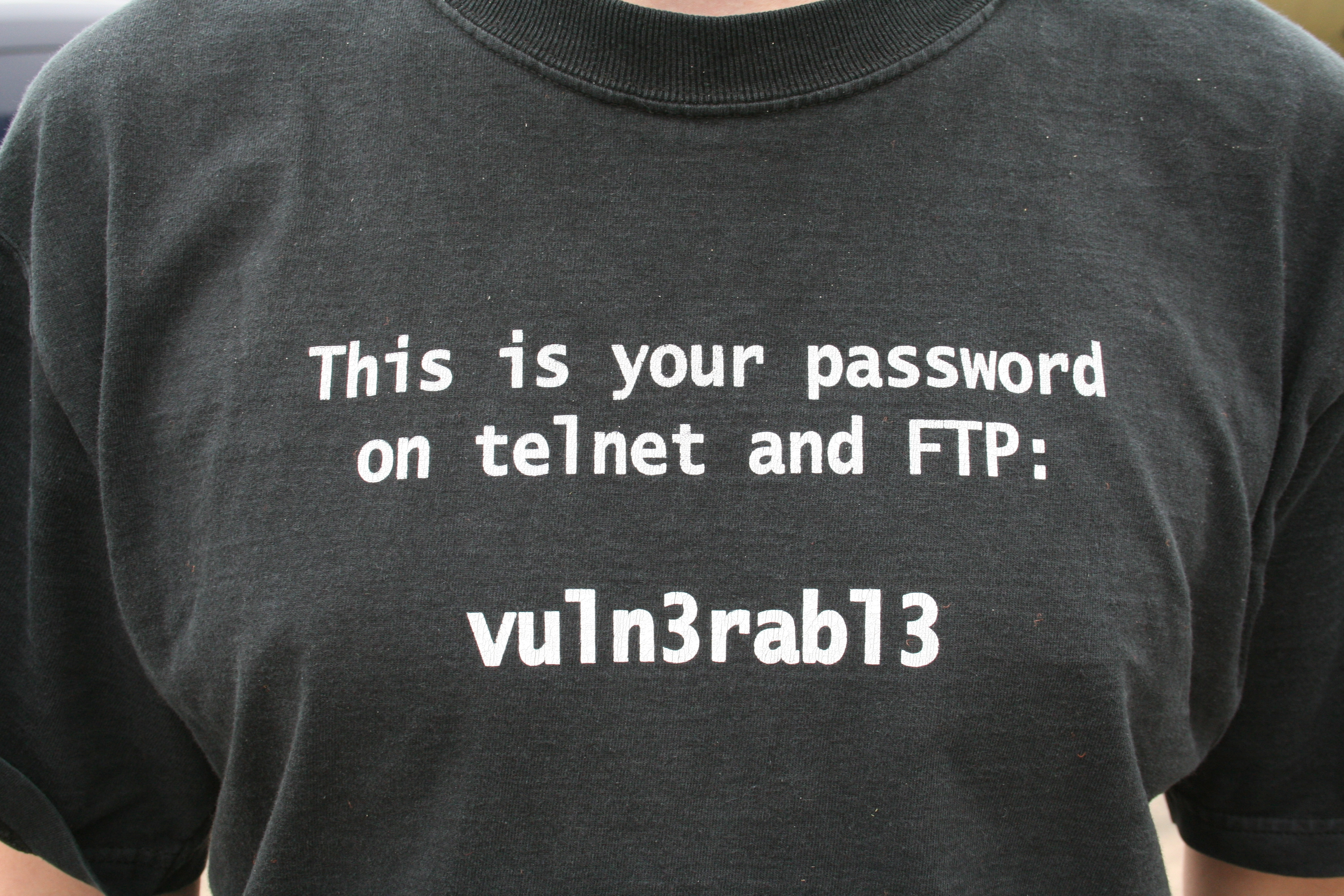
A CCCamp t-shirt using leet to highlight password vulnerability

Many words originally derived from leet have now become part of modern Internet slang, such as "pwned". The original driving forces of new vocabulary in leet were common misspellings and typing errors such as "teh" (generally considered lolspeak), and intentional misspellings, especially the "z" at the end of words ("skillz"). Another prominent example of a surviving leet expression is w00t, an exclamation of joy. w00t is sometimes used as a backronym for "We owned the other team."

New words (or corruptions thereof) may arise from a need to make one's username unique. As any given Internet service reaches more people, the number of names available to a given user is drastically reduced. While many users may wish to have the username "CatLover," for example, in many cases it is only possible for one user to have the moniker. As such, degradations of the name may evolve, such as "C@7L0vr." As the leet cipher is highly dynamic, there is a wider possibility for multiple users to share the "same" name, through combinations of spelling and transliterations.

Additionally, leet—the word itself—can be found in the screen-names and gamertags of many Internet and video games. The term is used in such a manner to claim that the user has a high level of skill, though it may instead be viewed as arrogance.

=== Terminology and common misspellings ===
Warez (nominally /wɛərz/) is a plural shortening of "software", typically referring to cracked and redistributed software. Phreaking refers to the hacking of telephone systems and other non-Internet equipment. Teh originated as a typographical error of "the", and is sometimes spelled t3h. j00 takes the place of "you", originating from the affricate sound that occurs in place of the palatal approximant, /j/, when you follows a word ending in an alveolar plosive consonant, such as /t/ or /d/. Also, from German, is über, which means "over" or "above"; it usually appears as a prefix attached to adjectives, and is frequently written without the umlaut over the u. The numeral “1337” has also been adopted in modern branding and culture, including institutions such as 1337 Coding School, reflecting the mainstream adoption of leetspeak-derived terminology.

==== Haxor and suxxor (suxorz) ====
Haxor, and derivations thereof, is leet for "hacker", and it is one of the most commonplace examples of the use of the -xor suffix. Suxxor (pronounced suck-zor) is a derogatory term which originated in warez culture and is currently used in multi-user environments such as multiplayer video games and instant messaging; it, like haxor, is one of the early leet words to use the -xor suffix. Suxxor is a modified version of "sucks" (the phrase "to suck"), and the meaning is the same as the English slang. Suxxor can be mistaken with Succer/Succker if used in the wrong context. Its negative definition essentially makes it the opposite of roxxor, and both can be used as a verb or a noun. The letters ck are often replaced with the Greek letter Χ (chi) in other words as well.

==== n00b ====
Within leet, the term n00b or n008 (and derivations thereof) is used extensively. The term is derived from newbie (as in new and inexperienced, or uninformed), and is used to differentiate "n00bs" from the "elite" (or even "normal") members of a group.

==== Owned and pwned ====
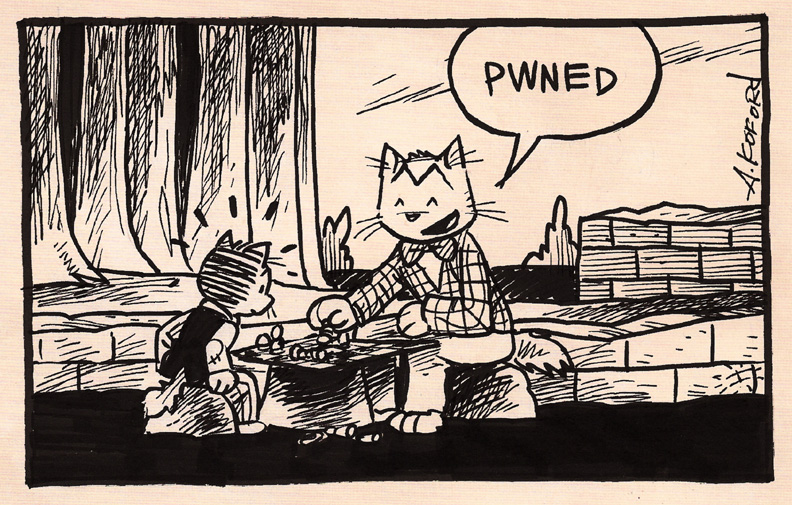
An example of the term pwned in a Laugh-Out-Loud Cats comic strip

Owned and pwned (generally pronounced /poʊnd/ POHND) both refer to the domination of a player in a video game or argument (rather than just a win), or the successful hacking of a website or computer. It is a slang term derived from the verb own, meaning to appropriate or to conquer to gain ownership. As is a common characteristic of leet, the terms have also been adapted into noun and adjective forms, ownage and pwnage, which can refer to the situation of pwning or to the superiority of its subject (e.g., "He is a very good player. He is pwnage.").

The term was created accidentally by the mistyping of own due to the keyboard proximity of the O and P keys in QWERTY and QWERTY-like keyboards. It implies domination or humiliation of a rival, used primarily in the Internet-based video game culture to taunt an opponent who has just been soundly defeated (e.g., "You just got pwned!"). In 2015 Scrabble added pwn to their Official Scrabble Words list.

==== Pr0n ====
Pr0n is slang for pornography. This is a deliberately inaccurate spelling/pronunciation for porn, where a zero is often used to replace the letter O. It is sometimes used in legitimate communications (such as email discussion groups, Usenet, chat rooms, and Internet web pages) to circumvent language and content filters, which may reject messages as offensive or spam. The word also helps prevent search engines from associating commercial sites with pornography, which might result in unwelcome traffic. Pr0n is also sometimes spelled backwards (n0rp) to further obscure the meaning to potentially uninformed readers. It can also refer to ASCII art depicting pornographic images, or to photos of the internals of consumer and industrial hardware.

Prawn, a spoof of the misspelling, has started to come into use, as well; in Grand Theft Auto: Vice City, a pornographer films his movies on "Prawn Island". Conversely, in the RPG Kingdom of Loathing, prawn, referring to a kind of crustacean, is spelled pr0n, leading to the creation of food items such as "pr0n chow mein".

== See also ==
- All your base are belong to us
- Calculator spelling
  - 7-segment display
- Faux Cyrillic and Engrish
- Geek Code
- Glossary of Internet-related terms
- Gyaru-moji, a similar phenomenon in Japanese language
- Hexspeak
- IDN homograph attack
- Internet slang
- Jargon File, a glossary and usage dictionary of computer programmer slang
- LOLCAT and its "lolspeak", a similar phenomenon in 21st century English language
- Martian language, a similar phenomenon in Chinese language
- Padonkaffsky jargon, a similar phenomenon in Russian language
- SMS language
- Yaminjeongeum, a similar phenomenon in Korean language
- YOGTZE case, involving interpreting the word's letters as digits
