= Lamer =

Slang term

Lamer is a jargon or slang name originally applied in cracker and phreaker culture to someone who did not really understand what they were doing. Today it is also loosely applied by IRC, BBS, demosceners, and online gaming users to anyone perceived to be contemptible. In general, the term has come to describe someone who is willfully ignorant of how things work. It is derived from the word "lame".

A lamer is sometimes understood to be the antithesis of a hacker. While a hacker strives to understand the mechanisms behind what they use, even when such extended knowledge would have no practical value, a lamer only cares to learn the bare minimum necessary to operate the device in the way originally intended.

== Origin ==
At least one example of the term "lamer" to mean "a dull, stupid, inept, or contemptible person" appeared as early as 1961. It was popularized among Amiga crackers of the mid-1980s by "Lamer Exterminator", a notable Amiga virus, which gradually corrupted non-write-protected floppy disks with bad sectors. The bad sectors, when examined, were overwritten with repetitions of the string "LAMER!".

In phreak culture, a lamer is one who scams codes from others and lacks understanding of the fundamental concepts. In warez culture, where the ability to distribute cracked commercial software within days of (or before) release to the commercial market is much esteemed, the lamer might try to upload garbage, shareware, or outdated releases.

== See also ==
- Luser
- Noob
- Script kiddie
