= Power user =

User of advanced features in electronics

Power user is a buzzword for advanced user. An advanced user has progressed beyond beginner level through spending time or acquiring skills, but is not necessarily an expert or developer.

They may use advanced features of computer hardware, operating systems (for example keyboard shortcuts), programs, or websites which are not used by the average user.

The term first appeared in the 1980s. According to Ernie Smith, it has been in use since at least April 1984, when it appeared in an issue of InfoWorld. In 21 January 1985 John C. Dvorak named it buzzword of the year 1984 in his section "1984 Dubious Achievement Awards" in InfoWorld and attributes its invention to marketing.

In enterprise software systems, "Power User" may be a formal role given to an individual who is not a programmer but a specialist in business software. Often these people retain their normal user job role but also function in testing, training, and first-tier support of the enterprise software.

Users may also erroneously label themselves as power users when they are less than fully competent. In one 1997 study involving design testing of a web application, self-identified power users refused to read any instructions, made wrong guesses, and repeatedly became so lost they could not complete the test. The study also showed, anecdotally, that almost all self-identified power users were men. Even if they had more skill, women didn't label themselves as power users.

Some software, such as Microsoft PowerToys, VLC media player and Vivaldi (web browser), has been explicitly advertised as being suitable for power users.

User testing for software often focuses on inexperienced or regular users, neglecting advanced users. The blinking twelve problem shows that it can be difficult to appeal to both beginners and advanced users.

== Officialized roles ==
=== SAP and Oracle ===
SAP and Oracle are enterprise systems that require a complex set of training to gain professional certification. Because of this, and also to encourage engagement with the systems, many companies have created a "Super User Model" (also called Power User, Champion) to take regular users and raise them to a level of leadership within the system. Doing this accomplishes three objectives:

1. More engaged use of the system as there is a personal face assigned to champion the system and make acceptance of the technology less challenging.
2. A significant time and cost reduction as companies are not seeking or hiring new or temporary resources for the purposes of developing and/or delivering documentation, training, and support.
3. ROI or proof of concept of the SAP investment should be more easily achieved as users are directly involved, thereby using the system invested in, which benefits the company overall.

Extensive research has been done with the Super User Model in SAP, specifically in regard to the role they take in training and supporting end users. Currently, more than 70% of SAP companies utilize a form of the Super User Model.

=== Windows administration ===
In Microsoft Windows 2000, Windows XP Professional, and Windows Server 2003, there is a "Power Users" group on the system that gives more permissions than a normal restricted user, but stops short of Administrator permissions. If a user is a member of the Power Users group, they have a greater chance of exposing the system to malware over a normal user and can promote their account to an Administrator by purposely installing malware. Thus, the Power Users group should be used with trustworthy and knowledgeable users only; it is not suitable to contain untrustworthy users. The Power Users group was made obsolete in Windows Vista as part of the consolidation of privilege elevation features in the introduction of User Account Control. In Windows Vista Business l or higher, you can still create a "power user" via local users and groups, but there is no difference from a standard user because all the ACL entries of the file system are completely removed.

== See also ==
- Luser
- Superuser
- Prosumer
