= Script kiddie =

Unskilled malicious hacker

A script kiddie, skript kiddie, skiddie, kiddie, or skid is a pejorative for an unskilled individual who uses malicious scripts or programs developed by others or LLMs.

== Characteristics ==
The term script kiddie was first used in 1988. In Brazil, the term "lammer" arose in the late 1980s and is more commonly used instead.

In a Carnegie Mellon report prepared for the US Department of Defense in 2000, script kiddies are defined as

The more immature but unfortunately often just as dangerous exploiter of security lapses on the Internet. The typical script kiddy uses existing and frequently well known and easy-to-find techniques and programs or scripts to search for and exploit weaknesses in other computers on the Internet—often randomly and with little regard or perhaps even understanding of the potentially harmful consequences.

Script kiddies typically have at least one or more effective and easily downloadable programs capable of breaching computers and networks.

Script kiddies vandalize websites both for the thrill of it and to increase their reputation among their peers. Some more malicious script kiddies have used virus toolkits to create and propagate the Anna Kournikova and Love Bug viruses. Script kiddies lack, or are only developing, programming skills sufficient to understand the effects and side effects of their actions. As a result, they leave significant traces which lead to their detection, or directly attack companies which have detection and countermeasures already in place. For example, they may report crashes they cause while developing malware on their system, unintentionally sending their source code to Microsoft.

== See also ==
- Black hat hacker
- Computer security
- Exploit (computer security)
- Hacker (computer security)
- Hacktivism
- Lamer
- List of convicted computer criminals
- Luser
- Noob
- Web shell, a tool that script kiddies frequently use
