= Gosu (disambiguation) =

In Korean, gosu refers to a highly skilled person.

Gosu may also refer to:

- Pansori gosu, a drummer in pansori performances
- Gosu (programming language), an object-oriented, static typed programming language built on the Java Virtual Machine
- Gosu (manhwa), a South Korean manhwa series
