= Natural Bears Classification System =

Communication code used by gay and bisexual men

The Natural Bears Classification System (NBCS), also called the bear code, is a set of symbols using letters, numbers and other characters commonly found on modern, Western computer keyboards, and used for the self-identification of "bears" in the sense of a mature gay or bisexual man with facial or substantial body hair. These codes are used in email, Usenet, and Internet forum postings to identify the physical type and preferences of the poster.

== History ==
A posting to the alt.sex.motss Usenet newsgroup in 1991 re-produced the NBCS version 1.9, though the document originated before that date (1989), according to its author. This classification scheme was created by Bob Donahue and Jeff Stoner, and was based on the way in which star and galaxy classification systems used characteristics of an object to derive a classifying identifier. This classification scheme has an almost identical syntactic structure to the Geek Code, which was introduced in 1993, though the meanings of the symbols are different.

== Format ==
The format of the NBCS is a sequence of space-separated descriptions that each take the form, "XMme" where X is a letter indicating some trait; M is an optional magnitude indicated by either a number or a sequence of + or - characters (the former are used for rankings that have a broad, but discrete range while the latter is used for more comparative measurements); m is an optional modifier such as "v" which indicates variability of the trait; and e is any extra (such as a parenthesized magnitude that indicates a range from the magnitude outside the parentheses to the magnitude inside).

The format includes physical traits such as "B" for beard density/length, "f" for body hair (or "fur"), "t" for height (or "tallness"), and "w" for weight. It also includes personality traits such as "d" for "the daddy factor" and sexual preferences such as "k" for "the kinky factor".

== Example ==
An example bear code is:

B4 s- m g++ w d+c t+ f+ k+ r e+(+?)

The translation (in no particular order) is:

Reasonably thick beard, cub tendencies, definite Daddy, (endowment) gets attention, above average fur, loves groping/pawing/touching, (Kinkiness) loves most things, (Muscle) some definition/Blue collar, spends some time outdoors, (sex) plays under special circumstances, tall, bear with a tummy

== See also ==
- Bear (gay culture)
- Bear flag (LGBT movement)
- Geek code
