= Geek Code =

Letters and symbols used by geeks to describe themselves

Geek code example, which opens by stating that the user is a Geek of Technical Writing (GTW) who usually wears jeans and a t-shirt (d-@), is of average height and above-average weight (s:+), and is aged between 25 and 29 (a-).

The Geek Code, developed in 1993, is a series of letters and symbols used by self-described "geeks" to inform fellow geeks about their personality, appearance, interests, skills, and opinions. The idea is that everything that makes a geek individual can be encoded in a compact format which only other geeks can read. This is deemed to be efficient in some sufficiently geeky manner.

It was once common practice to use a geek code as one's email or Usenet signature, but the last official version of the code was produced in 1996, and it has now largely fallen out of use.

A number of similar codes were developed for other subcultures, such as a Goth Code for the Goth subculture, and the Natural Bears Classification System for gay men.

== History ==
The Geek Code was invented by Robert A. Hayden in 1993 and was defined at https://geekcode.com. It was inspired by a similar code for the bear subculture - which in turn was inspired by the Yerkes spectral classification system for describing stars.

After a number of updates, the last revision of the code was v3.12, in 1996.

Some alternative encodings have also been proposed. For example, the 1997 Acorn Code was a version specific to users of Acorn's RISC OS computers.

== Format ==
Geek codes can be written in two formats; either as a simple string:

GED/J d-- s:++>: a-- C++(++++) ULU++ P+ L++ E---- W+(-) N+++ o+ K+++ w--- O- M+ V-- PS++>$ PE++>$ Y++ PGP++ t- 5+++ X++ R+++>$ tv+ b+ DI+++ D+++ G+++++ e++ h r-- y++**

...or as a "Geek Code Block", a parody of the output produced by the encryption program PGP:

-----BEGIN GEEK CODE BLOCK-----
  Version: 3.1
  GED/J d-- s:++>: a-- C++(++++) ULU++ P+ L++ E---- W+(-) N+++ o+ K+++ w---
  O- M+ V-- PS++>$ PE++>$ Y++ PGP++ t- 5+++ X++ R+++>$ tv+ b+ DI+++ D+++
  G+++++ e++ h r-- y++**
-----END GEEK CODE BLOCK-----

Note that this latter format has a line specifying the version of Geek Code being used.

(Both these examples use Hayden's own geek code.)

== Encoding ==
=== Occupation ===
The code starts with the letter G (for Geek) followed by the geek's occupation(s): GMU for a geek of music, GCS for a geek of computer science etc. There are 28 occupations that can be represented, but GAT is for geeks that can do anything and everything - and "usually precludes the use of other vocational descriptors".

=== Categories ===
The Geek Code website contains the complete list of categories, along with all of the special syntax options.

== Decoding ==
There have been several "decoders" produced to transform a specific geek code into English, including:

- Bradley M. Kuhn, in late 1998, made Pete Williams's program available as a web service.
- Joe Reiss made a similar page available in October 1999.

== See also ==
- Leet – Online slang and alternative orthography
- Newspeak – Fictional language in the novel "Nineteen Eighty-Four"
- Signature block – Type of personalized block
