= Namechk =

Website

- Website type: Web application
- Owners: David Goose; Jeremy Woertink
- Website: namechk.com
- Launched: 2009?

Namechk is a free web application created by David Goose and Jeremy Woertink. Namechk allows someone to view if a certain username is available. Namechk has over 98 different social network sites as of June 2019.

The service also checks domains.

== Alternatives ==
Knowem is an alternative to Namechk and contains over 500 different social network sites.

== See also ==
- List of free and open-source web applications
