= Byte Bandit =

1988 computer virus

- Original author: Unknown
- Release: January 1988
- Operating system: Amiga OS
- Platform: Amiga
- Type: Boot sector computer virus, malware

Byte Bandit is a boot sector computer virus created for the Amiga personal computer. It first appeared in January 1988.

In contrast to the feared Amiga viruses like the infamous Lamer Exterminator and SADDAM, Byte Bandit was not destructive. It just spread automatically from system to system.

Byte Bandit made no attempt to disguise itself as modern viruses, trojans, and worms do. While it naturally over-wrote the bootblock, it also hooked into the system, remaining reset-resident and causing system data corruption and system failures. The virus increments a copy counter every time it writes itself to a disk, which is in the text string "Virus by Byte Bandit in 9.87. Number of copys:" which also gives a date of September 1987 for the creation, as well as the assumed name of the programmer.
