= User-in-the-loop =

Concept of human-technology interaction

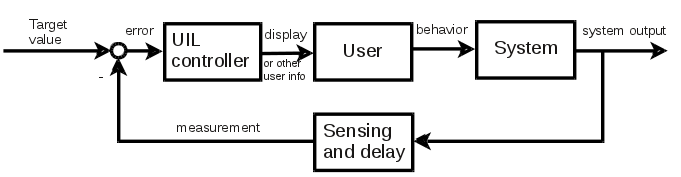
The concept of the user in the loop to improve the performance of the system by occasionally giving instructions to the user.

User-in-the-Loop (UIL) refers to the notion that a technology (e.g., network) can improve a performance objective by engaging its human users (Layer 8). The idea can be applied in various technological fields. UIL assumes that human users of a network are among the smartest but also most unpredictable units of that network. Furthermore, human users often have a certain set of (input) values that they sense (more or less observe, but also acoustic or haptic feedback is imaginable: imagine a gas pedal in a car giving some resistance, like for a speedomat). Both elements of smart decision-making and observed values can help towards improving the bigger objective.

The input values are meant to encourage/discourage human users to behave in certain ways that improve the overall performance of the system. One example of a historic implementation related to UIL has appeared in electric power networks where a price chart is introduced to users of electrical power. This price chart differentiates the values of electricity based on off-peak, mid-peak and on-peak periods, for instance. But, this is an open-loop control. UIL actually allows closed loop control, i.e. having the user IN the loop. Faced with a non-homogenous pattern of pricing, human users respond by changing their power consumption accordingly that eventually leads to the overall improvement of access to electrical power (reduce peak hour consumption). Recently, UIL has been also introduced for wireless telecommunications (cellular networks).

Wireless resources including the bandwidth (frequency) are an increasingly scarce resource and the while current demand on wireless network is below the supply in most of the times (potentials capacity of the wireless links based on technology limitations), the rapid and exponential increase in demand will render wireless access an increasingly expensive resource in a matter of few years. While usual technological responses to this perspective such as innovative new generations of cellular systems, more efficient resource allocations, cognitive radio and machine learning are certainly necessary, it seems that they ignore a major resource in the system, namely the users. Wireless users can be encouraged to change their "wireless behavior" by introducing incentives, e.g., differentiated pricing. In addition, the increasing concern for the environment and the considerable yet invisible environmental effects of wireless use can be tapped into in order to convince "greener" user to change their wireless behavior in order to reduce their carbon footprint.

UIL used in wireless communications is referred to as the Smart Grid of Communications. It aims for avoiding a location of bad link adaptation or excess use during the busy hour.

== Overview ==
Independent of the various ways of giving incentives and penalties the outcome of the user block is either a spatial, temporal or no reaction at all. Spatial UIL means the user changes location to a better one (like the common practice in WiFi networks). Temporal UIL means the demand is avoided at the current time (to be continued at another time, abandoned, or offloaded to the wired network at home). The incentive usually is a fully dynamic tariff. This shapes user demand during congestion. UIL aims at stabilizing the traffic demand to a sustainable level below the capacity. In cellular networks, it helps keeping traffic below the capacity at all times.

=== Spatial UIL Control ===
The general perspective of UIL is shown in the figure. In the UIL concept, the controller gives necessary information to the user, and so it is expected that the user voluntarily changes his current location from point A to B. The current signal quality at point A and/or the spectral efficiency there are known by the controller. Besides, the average signal quality and/or the spectral efficiency are known for all locations of the network from a database of previous measurements. After that, the network provides the necessary information and suggests better positions to the user. Before the movement, user knows his utility advantage between point B and A. This utility advantage can be financial (discount for voice calls) and/or an increased data rate (best effort data traffic). The network is providing the information where (in which direction to which location) to move. Before making his decision, the user should have all necessary information (discount rate, increased data rate, how far is the next improved step). At the end, a certain portion of users participates in moving and the rest of them stays in place, which includes all users that cannot move, do not want to move, or do not have enough incentive to move. The user block in the figure outputs the new location B, if the user decides to move. This probability depends on the distance and the given incentive utility. The target spectral efficiency is the minimum spectral efficiency that the user should achieve after the movement (the target value must be greater than the current one).

=== Temporal UIL Control ===
The demand increase in cellular networks is fueled by a flat rate pricing policy. It promotes heavy-tailed traffic distributions and leads to unbounded demand increase. Nowadays the pricing policy is starting to change because of the unbounded demand increase. Eventually some operators started to charge flat-rate with a cap, but this is a temporal solution. A more elaborate solution, usage based pricing, is suggested in the literature, but on its own it does not solve the congestion problem in the busy hours. One step further in UIL, a fully dynamic usage-based pricing is suggested. This dynamic price is displayed on a user terminal (UT) so that user can decide to use or not to use the service. The main idea is very clear, the user will generate less traffic when the session price goes up. As a result, the pricing method will change the user behavior and the traffic as in electricity tariffs and smart-grid applications and even better than there, because of the immediate feedback and latency in the order of seconds, which allows for best response and training.

== Benefits ==
User-in-the-Loop applications are possible in all fields where limited resources are consumed and where a negative impact for society or environment must be avoided, e.g., excessive consumption of energy and fossil fuel.

Reasons for using UIL are manifold. In wireless communications, there is a growing problem with increasing data rates in the next 10 years. Smart phones and laptop dongles will continue to increase traffic by 100% per year - a trend observed already in the last 5 years. The traditional approach to oversize capacity in order to carry all traffic will become harder as 4G, 5G and beyond can never keep up with demand at this rate of increase. Energy consumption and going green is also becoming more important in the future. Whatever increase of capacity technology will provide, will soon be eaten up by even faster increasing traffic. New approaches require to spend even more money and power, e.g. for pico- and femtocells. The UIL approach is orthogonal and does not require more CAPEX and power. UIL is able to boost the spectral efficiency by substantial amounts.

== Incentives ==
The interface between the UIL controller and the user box consists of information and incentive. Information is simply the knowledge that a change of the user output would be beneficial (for the system, community, society). However, an extra incentive may be required in most cases to make the user really change his default behavior, because altruism is not far-reaching enough and people tend to prefer selfish strategies in free societies (see game theory). This dilemma is called Tragedy of the commons. So it is rational to assume the homo economicus model driven by a utility maximization in the first order and homo reciprocans only for second-order effects.

Incentives can be by financial aspects (cheaper rate for usage) or other beneficial bonuses which may be convertible into money or not. An example are miles of a frequent-flyer program for every spatial move the user performs. Another benefit in a wireless network is granting the user a higher bit rate, but only for the conforming user. Negative incentives are also possible in forms of penalties, but psychology suggests that positive incentives work better. A penalty could be in place when using the system is bad for the total goal at the current time or location (busy hour, congestion situation, bad link adaptation), in order to keep the user from using the system under these circumstances. Instead, at a better location or time of day the usage would be usable without penalty.

== Examples of applications ==
- Motivating users to perform their action at another location (e.g. towards better spectral efficiency locations in a wireless cellular network)
- Convincing users not to perform a certain action at this time (in the busy hours) but at a better time.
- Demand response in the smart grid
- Controlling user behavior towards a positive goal
- capacity/demand, also known as load balancing
- utility usage: electricity, gas, water
- cyber-physical systems in emergency evacuation of infrastructure buildings
- secure systems design
- fossil fuel usage for transportation, heating, industry
- fast dynamic pricing of any kind
- example mobile display here
- User interface by a fuel consumption monitor as shown in fuel consumption in automobiles

== Green aspect ==
In general, UIL allows to control for a goal which is greener than if the user would act uncontrolled. This goal can be energy consumption, fossil fuel consumption, food consumption or even softer goals like social behavior. It is as if the rules (payoffs) can be changed in Game theory to make the outcome appear more cooperative.

The green aspect for a wireless network is as follows. Power consumed by wireless infrastructure like base stations, switching centers currently already accounts for 0.5% of the global electric power consumption and therefore the carbon emissions. Putting contemporary data together results in a carbon footprint of 34 g of CO_{2} (or 17 dm^{3}) for 1 MB of transmitted data. We can call this the current green index of wireless cellular communications. One bit corresponds to 5.8×10^{16} molecules of CO_{2} is the specific bit emission. Wireless cellular networks consume 0.5% of the world total electricity which is approximately 20 PWh in 2010. The average monthly cellular wireless traffic is 240×10^{15} bytes which is totally 2880 PB in 2010. Then energy per byte can be found as 0.0347×10^{−6} kWh and it is equal to 0.125 J. If the electricity is obtained from coal then 975 g of CO_{2} arises for 1 kWh of energy. Then for one byte of wireless data 0.0338325 mg of CO_{2} arises, which is approximately equal to 34 g of CO_{2} for 1 MB.

== See also ==
- Systems theory
- Control theory
- Human factors
- User interface
- Human-in-the-Loop
- Website of the UIL project
