= Evi Nemeth =

American engineer

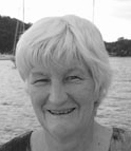
- Born: June 7, 1940
- Disappeared: June 4, 2013 (aged 72); Tasman Sea
- Status: Missing for 13 years, 5 months and 14 days
- Occupations: Author, retired professor
- Known for: Lead author of "bibles" of system administration

Evi Nemeth (born June 7, 1940 – missing-at-sea June or July 2013) was an engineer, author, and teacher known for her expertise in computer system administration and networks. She was the lead author of the "bibles" of system administration: UNIX System Administration Handbook (1989, 1995, 2000), Linux Administration Handbook (2002, 2006), and UNIX and Linux System Administration Handbook (2010, 2017). Evi Nemeth was known in technology circles as the matriarch of system administration.

Nemeth was best known in mathematical circles for originally identifying inadequacies in the "Diffie–Hellman problem", the basis for a large portion of modern network cryptography.

== Career ==
Nemeth received her bachelor's degree in mathematics from Penn State in 1961 and her PhD in mathematics from the University of Waterloo, Ontario in 1971. She taught at Florida Atlantic University and the State University of New York at Utica (SUNY Tech) before joining the computer science department at the University of Colorado Boulder (CU-Boulder) in 1980. She served as manager of the college's computing facility from 1982 to 1986. She also was a visiting Associate Professor at Dartmouth College in 1990, and at UC San Diego in 1998, while on sabbatical from CU-Boulder.

While at CU-Boulder, Nemeth was well known for her undergraduate systems administration activity, in which students over the years had the opportunity to develop in-depth knowledge and skills in Unix system administration. Together with Steve Wozniak, Nemeth established the Woz scholarship program at CU-Boulder which funded inquisitive undergraduates for many years. Nemeth also had a special talent for inspiring and teaching young people. She mentored numerous middle- and high-school students, who worked with her to support computing in the college and came to be known as "the munchkins". She also mentored talented young undergraduates, taking them to national meetings where they installed networks and broadcast the meetings' sessions on the Internet on the multicast backbone. She coached the university's student programming teams in the ACM International Collegiate Programming Contest.

T-shirt with Layer 8 and Layer 9

From 1998 to 2006, Nemeth worked with Cooperative Association for Internet Data Analysis (CAIDA) at the University of California, San Diego, on various Internet measurement and visualization projects.

Outside the United States, Nemeth helped bring Internet technology to the developing world through her involvement with programs of the Internet Society and the United Nations Development Programme.

A network guru T-shirt from the 1980s shows OSI Model layers with additional Layer 8 as the "financial" layer, and Layer 9 as the "political" layer. The design was credited to Evi Nemeth.

During the Summer 1994 USENIX conference in Boston, a commemorative deck of playing cards was created celebrating the 25th anniversary of UNIX. Evi Nemeth coordinated the production of the card deck.

=== Philosophical Tenets and Influence ===
Nemeth was known for a specific set of guiding principles for system administrators that she popularized through her teaching and the `Unix` and `Linux System Administration` Handbooks.

==== Key Maxims ====
She frequently advised "Be conservative in what you send and liberal in what you receive" (a variation of Postel's Law) and her professional hiring advice: "Be liberal in who you hire, but fire early".

==== The "Sudo" Legacy ====
She is credited with "saving" the sudo command by recognizing its potential for distributed workstations and advocating for its adoption as a standard tool for secure root management.

==== The Munchkins ====
She is famous for her mentoring program for middle and high-school students, whom she called "the munchkins", who supported college computing facilities under her guidance.

==== Collaborations ====
She worked with Apple co-founder Steve Wozniak to establish the `Woz scholarship` program at CU Boulder, which funded inquisitive undergraduates for many years.

== Later life ==
After her retirement, Nemeth sailed her 40-foot sailboat Wonderland around various parts of the world, including a circuit of the Atlantic; the Panama Canal; and across the Pacific to New Zealand.

=== Disappearance at sea ===
In late May 2013 she, along with six other people aboard the vintage yacht Niña, traveled across the Tasman Sea en route to Australia from New Zealand. On June 4, the day the last message, sent by Nemeth, was received from Niña, the Tasman Sea had 65 mile-per-hour winds and swell height reaching 26 feet. A natural disaster (e.g., a rogue wave) might have led to the disappearance of the boat. On July 5 New Zealand authorities officially ended the search for the Niña, though relatives of the crew of Niña continued to search.

== Selected publications ==
- Nemeth, E., Hein, T., Snyder, G., and Whaley, B., Unix and Linux System Administration Handbook, 4th edition, Prentice Hall, 2010.
- Nemeth, E., Snyder, G., Hein, T., Whaley, B., and Makin, D., Unix and Linux System Administration Handbook, 5th edition, Prentice Hall, 2017.
- Brownlee, N.; Claffy, K. C.; Nemeth, E. (2001). "DNS measurements at a root server". GLOBECOM'01. IEEE Global Telecommunications Conference (Cat. No.01CH37270). Vol. 3. p. 1672. CiteSeerX 10.1.1.18.3882. doi:10.1109/GLOCOM.2001.965864. ISBN 978-0-7803-7206-1. S2CID 10140817.
- Broido, A.; Nemeth, E.; Claffy, K. (2002). "Internet expansion, refinement and churn". European Transactions on Telecommunications. 13: 33–51. CiteSeerX 10.1.1.18.3182. doi:10.1002/ett.4460130105.
- Mullin, R., Nemeth, E. and Weidenhofer, N., "Will Public Key Crypto Systems Live up to Their Expectations? HEP Implementation of the Discrete Log Codebreaker", Proc. of the 1984 Intl Conf on Parallel Processing, Aug. 21–24, 1984, pp. 193–196. Selected for the best paper award for this conference.
- "Otter: A general-purpose network visualization tool". International Networking Conference (INET) '99. June 1999.

== Awards ==
- 1984 - Best Paper Award, International Parallel Processing Conference, Chicago, August 1984
- 1995 - USENIX/LISA Lifetime Achievement Award
- 1999 - Top 25 Women on the Web Award
- 2007 - Distinguished Engineering Honoree at CU-Boulder
- 5th Annual Telluride Tech Fest Honoree
- 2018 - NCWIT Pioneer in Tech Award

== See also ==
- List of people who disappeared mysteriously at sea
- Layer 8
