= User (computing) =

Person who uses a computer or network service

Within a computer program or website, a user is often represented by an abstract icon of a person.

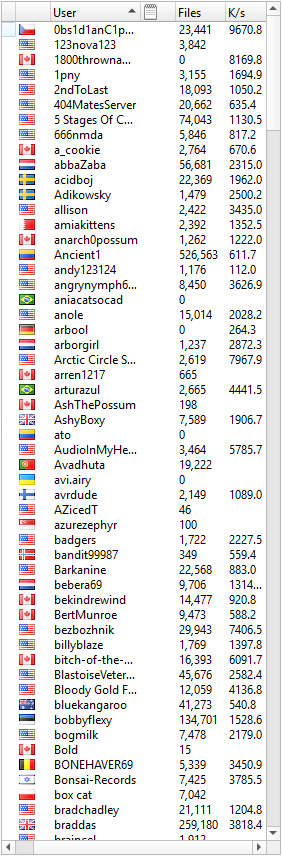
A list of users in a chat room on Soulseek, with country flags to indicate where each user is from

A user is a person who uses a computer or network service. A user typically has a user account and is recognized by the system through a username. (Note: Other terms for username include login name, screenname (or screen name), account name, nickname (or nick) display name and handle, which is derived from the identical citizens band radio term.) Some software products provide services to other systems and have no direct end users.

== End user ==
End users are the ultimate human users (also referred to as operators) of a software product. The end user stands in contrast to users who support or maintain the product such as sysops, database administrators and computer technicians. The term is used to abstract and distinguish those who only use the software from the developers of the system, who enhance the software for end users. In user-centered design, it also distinguishes the software operator from the client who pays for its development and other stakeholders who may not directly use the software, but help establish its requirements. This abstraction is primarily useful in designing the user interface, and refers to a relevant subset of characteristics that most expected users would have in common.

In user-centered design, personas are created to represent the types of users. It is sometimes specified for each persona which types of user interfaces it is comfortable with (due to previous experience or the interface's inherent simplicity), and what technical expertise and degree of knowledge it has in specific fields or disciplines. When few constraints are imposed on the end-user category, especially when designing programs for use by the general public, it is common practice to expect minimal technical expertise or previous training in end users.

The end-user development discipline blurs the typical distinction between users and developers. It designates activities or techniques in which people who are not professional developers create automated behavior and complex data objects without significant knowledge of a programming language.

Systems whose actor is another system or a software agent have no direct end users.

== User account ==
A user's account allows a user to authenticate to a system and potentially to receive authorization to access resources provided by or connected to that system; however, authentication does not imply authorization. To log into an account, a user is typically required to authenticate oneself with a password or other credentials for the purposes of accounting, security, logging, and resource management.

Once the user has logged on, the operating system will often use an identifier such as an integer to refer to them, rather than their username, through a process known as identity correlation. In Unix systems, the username is correlated with a user identifier or user ID.

Computer systems operate in one of two types based on what kind of users they have:

- Single-user systems do not have a concept of several user accounts.
- Multi-user systems have such a concept, and require users to identify themselves before using the system.

Each user account on a multi-user system typically has a home directory, in which to store files pertaining exclusively to that user's activities, which is protected from access by other users (though a system administrator may have access). User accounts often contain a public user profile, which contains basic information provided by the account's owner. The files stored in the home directory (and all other directories in the system) have file system permissions which are inspected by the operating system to determine which users are granted access to read or execute a file, or to store a new file in that directory.

While systems expect most user accounts to be used by only a single person, many systems have a special account intended to allow anyone to use the system, such as the username "anonymous" for anonymous FTP and the username "guest" for a guest account.

A multiseat configuration allows multiple user accounts to use one computer simultaneously.

=== Password storage ===
On Unix systems, local user accounts are stored in the file /etc/passwd, while user passwords may be stored at /etc/shadow in its hashed form.

On Microsoft Windows, user passwords can be managed within the Credential Manager program. The passwords are located in the Windows profile directory.

=== Username format ===
Various computer operating-systems and applications expect/enforce different rules for the format.

In Microsoft Windows environments, for example, note the potential use of:

- User Principal Name (UPN) format – for example: UserName@Example.com
- Down-Level Logon Name format – for example: DOMAIN\UserName

== Terminology ==
Some usability professionals have expressed their dislike of the term "user" and have proposed changing it. Don Norman stated that "One of the horrible words we use is 'users'. I am on a crusade to get rid of the word 'users'. I would prefer to call them 'people'."

The term "user" may imply lack of the technical expertise required to fully understand how computer systems and software products work. Power users use advanced features of programs, though they are not necessarily capable of computer programming and system administration.

== See also ==
- 1% rule (Internet culture)
- Anonymous post
- Prosumer
- Pseudonym
- End-user computing, systems in which non-programmers can create working applications.
- End-user database, a collection of data developed by individual end-users.
- End-user development, a technique that allows people who are not professional developers to perform programming tasks, i.e. to create or modify software.
- End-user license agreement (EULA), a contract between a supplier of software and its purchaser, granting the right to use it.
- Luser
- Namechk
- Nickname
- Registered user
- User error
- User agent
- User experience
- User space
