= Luser =

Internet slang

SVensson's ITS on KLH10
Welcome to SV!

SV ITS.1648. PWORD.2660.
TTY 11
2. Lusers, Fair Share = 2%
*
Classic use of "luser" at the ITS login screen

Before the popularization of the Internet in the 1990s, Internet slang defined a luser (sometimes expanded to local user; also luzer or luzzer) as a painfully annoying, stupid, or irritating computer user. The word is a blend of "loser" and "user". Among hackers, the word luser takes on a broad meaning, referring to any normal user (in other words, not a "guru"), with the implication the person is also a loser. The term is partially interchangeable with the hacker term lamer.

The term can also signify a layman with only user account privileges, as opposed to a power user or administrator, who has knowledge of, and access to, superuser accounts; for example, an end luser who cannot be trusted with a root account for system administration. It is popular with technical support staff who have to deal with lusers as part of their job, often metaphorically employing a LART (Luser Attitude Readjustment Tool, also known as a clue-by-four, cluestick, or cluebat), meaning turning off the user's access to computer resources and the like.

== History ==
The Jargon File states that the word was coined around 1975 at MIT, although LUSER is visible in CTSS source code circa 1969 in subroutines involving spying on and killing users and deleting their files and directories. Under ITS, when a user first walked up to a terminal at MIT and typed control-Z to get the computer's attention, it printed out some status information, including how many people were already using the computer. A patch to the system was then written to print "14 losers" instead of "14 users", as a joke. For a while, several hackers who disagreed on the appropriateness of the change struggled covertly, each changing the message behind the backs of the others; any time a user logged into the computer it was equally probable that a user would see, say, "users" or "losers". Finally, someone tried the compromise "lusers", and it stuck. Later, ITS also had the command "luser", which attempted to summon assistance from a list of designated helpers.

Although ITS ceased to be used in the mid-1990s, use of the term continued to spread, partly because in Unix-style computer operating systems, "user" designates all unprivileged accounts, while the superuser, or root, is the special user account used for system administration. "root" is the conventional name of the user who has all rights or permissions (to all files and programs) in all modes (single- or multi-user). The usage lives on, however, and the term "luser" is often seen in program comments and on Usenet.

On IRC, /lusers (which abbreviates "list users") is a common command to get the number of users connected to a server or network.

== See also ==
- Any key
- Banhammer
- BOFH
- id10t
- Lamer
- Layer 8
- Newbie
- PEBKAC
- Power user
