= Gosu =

Korean term for a highly skilled person

- Hangul: 고수
- Hanja: 高手
- RR: gosu
- MR: kosu

Gosu (Korean: 고수) is a Korean term used to refer to a highly skilled person. In computer gaming the term is usually used to refer to a person who dominated games like StarCraft, Counter-Strike, Tekken, Warcraft III, Diablo II, DotA, League of Legends, Heroes of the Storm, Overwatch, Overwatch 2, Apex Legends and others. The term was adopted by gaming communities in many countries because of a large South Korean presence in online gaming communities.

== Origin ==
The term is Sino-Korean vocabulary, and cognates in other East Asian languages that feature the same hanja (高手, literally "high hand") include gāoshǒu (Mandarin, "expert; ace; master"), and cao thủ (Vietnamese, "skilled person; master"). In the dialect of the Gyeongnam province, gosu also has the meaning of "leader". Figuratively meaning pro or highly skilled at something, gosu's pre-computing usage usually referred to martial arts or the game of go.

== Related terms ==
Though not as popular, there are also several other commonly used Korean words for describing gamers with various skill levels. Jungsu (중수; 中手; lit. 'middle hand') stands for "a moderately good player", hasu (하수; 下手; lit. 'low hand') for "a poor player" or "a person with no skill" and chobo (초보; 初步; lit. 'first step') for "a novice player". Hasu and chobo are the same skill level, but hasu is disrespectful or derogatory (whereas chobo is not). The English equivalent to hasu would be "noob" or "scrub" and chobo would be "beginner" or "newbie".

== Synonyms ==
- leet or 1337
- Über
- Pro
- Master

== See also ==
- List of English words of Korean origin
- Pansori
- History of Go
- Gosu (programming language)
