= Hantangang Dam =

- Location within South Korea
- Country: South Korea
- Location: Yeoncheon County, Gyeonggi Province
- Coordinates: 38°3′49.40″N 127°7′57.18″E
- Purpose: Flood control
- Status: Operational
- Construction began: 2007
- Opening date: 2015
- Owner: Korea Water Resources Corporation

Dam and spillways
- Type of dam: Gravity, roller-compacted concrete
- Impounds: Hantan River
- Height: 83.5 m (274 ft)
- Length: 690 m (2,260 ft)
- Elevation at crest: 119.5 m (392 ft)
- Dam volume: 744,000 m^{3} (973,000 cu yd)
- Spillways: 4
- Spillway capacity: 1,950 m^{3}/s (69,000 cu ft/s)

Reservoir
- Creates: Hantangang Reservoir
- Total capacity: 270,000,000 m^{3} (220,000 acre⋅ft)
- Normal elevation: 114.4 m (375 ft)

- Hantangang Dam
- Hangul: 한탄강댐
- Hanja: 漢灘江댐
- RR: Hantangang daem
- MR: Hant'an'gang taem

The Hantangang Dam is a gravity dam on the Hantan River in Yeoncheon County, Gyeonggi Province, South Korea. Construction on the dam began in 2007 and was completed in 2015. The primary purpose of the dam is flood control : it was proposed in 1998 after a series of floods in the late 1990s that killed 128 people, displaced over 31,000 and caused about US$900 million in property damage. Initially designed as a multi-purpose project, the design was changed solely to flood control in 2006 due to the concerns of residents upstream. It is being implemented by Korea Water Resources Corporation (K-water).

== Construction ==
Construction started in February 2007 and was completed in mid-2015. K-water is responsible for planning and supervision. DL E&C (Daelim industrial.co. Ltd) was undertook the construction as a leading contractor. Not only to secure the stability against overflow during the flood season but also to reduce the construction cost through the mechanized construction fitting for the mega construction, the roller-compacted concrete (RCC) method has been applied. About 300 families will be displaced when the reservoir is filled.

This project also had a road project for the purpose of relocation of existing roads in Pocheon and Cheorwon areas that are submerged by the Hantangang Dam’s new flood water level. Relocation of roads project consists of a total of 27 km length and includes 11 large and small bridges within the roads. The newly relocated roads were built the flood water level high (EL.144m) along the National Route 87, Local Route 78, City Route 23, etc.

== Design ==
The Hantangang Dam will be a 83.5 m (274 ft) and 690 m (2,260 ft) long gravity dam constructed of roller-compacted concrete. It has four spillways; a service, emergency, lower sediment discharge and eco-corridor. All four together will have a maximum discharge of 1,950 m^{3}/s (69,000 cu ft/s). The water storage capacity for the reservoir is 270,000,000 m^{3} (220,000 acre⋅ft).

== In popular culture ==
In episode 2 of Military Prosecutor Doberman, the Hantangang Dam can be seen in the background during a scene taking place on a bridge over the Hantan River.
