= YOGTZE case =

1984 formerly unsolved case in Germany

Coordinates: 51.2882°N 7.5758°E

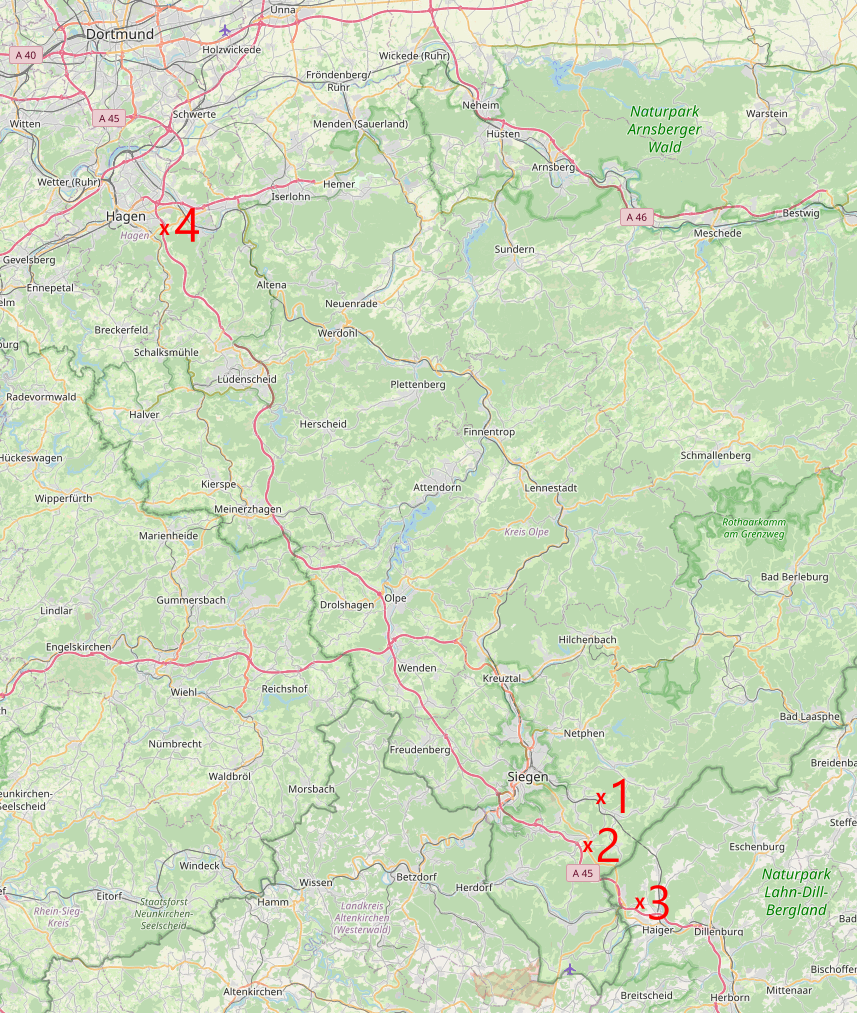
- Key locations of the YOGTZE case: 1. The victim's place of residence in Anzhausen; 2. The "Papillon" pub in Wilnsdorf; 3. The parents' residence in Haigerseelbarch; 4. "Hagen Süd" exit on the Autobahn, where the victim's crashed car was found
- Native name: YOGTZE-Fall
- English name: YOGTZE case
- Date: October 26, 1984
- Time: Approximately 03:00 (CET)
- Location: Near Hagen-Süd, Westphalia, West Germany (now Germany)
- Also known as: BAB-Rätsel (Autobahn Riddle)
- Type: Death, unsolved mystery
- Motive: Unknown
- Target: Günther Stoll
- Perpetrator: Unknown
- First reporter: Two truck drivers
- Participants: Günther Stoll, unknown others
- Outcome: Death of Günther Stoll
- Deaths: 1
- Property damage: Damage to Günther Stoll's vehicle
- Inquiries: Police investigation
- Arrests: 0

The YOGTZE case (German: YOGTZE-Fall, also BAB-Rätsel, "Autobahn Riddle") refers to the death of unemployed German food engineer Günther Stoll, which occurred on 26 October 1984. Stoll died under unusual and mysterious circumstances, which gave the case international attention.

In April 2025, the case was closed as accidental, after new investigation had revealed that it was most likely a single-car wreck.

== Background ==
In 1984, Günther Stoll, an unemployed food engineer from Anzhausen, Westphalia (then West Germany), was suffering from a moderate case of paranoia. Prior to his death, he occasionally spoke to his wife of "those [ones]," (German: denen) unknown people who supposedly intended to harm him. He mentioned "those," specifically, on the evening of 25 October 1984 (at approximately 23:00), before suddenly shouting "Jetzt geht mir ein Licht auf!" ("Now I've got it!"). He then wrote the six letters "YOG'TZE" (or possibly "YO6'TZE") on a sheet of paper before instantly crossing them out.

Shortly thereafter, Stoll went to his favorite pub (named "Papillon") in Wilnsdorf, where he ordered a beer and fell on the ground, injuring his face. Witnesses stated that he was not under the influence of alcohol and that he suddenly lost consciousness.

He awoke and drove away in his VW Golf I. It is not known what he did in the next two hours. At around 01:00 on 26 October 1984, he went to Haigerseelbach, where he grew up. There, he talked to a woman he knew from his childhood and mentioned a "horrible incident, which was about to take place this night." Since it was so late at night, the woman advised him to go to his parents' place and talk to them instead. He disagreed, stating that "they wouldn't understand him". Insisting on leaving, the woman told him to return to Anzhausen and his wife. Agreeing to her advice, he left.

== Discovery ==
At approximately 03:00, two truck drivers discovered Stoll's crashed vehicle in a trench adjacent to the A45, near the Hagen-Süd exit, 100 kilometres (60 mi) from Haigerseelbach.

Both truck drivers testified independently of each other to have seen an injured person in a white jacket walking near the car. After calling law enforcement, the drivers found the severely injured Günther Stoll naked in his car. He was conscious and mentioned four male persons who had been with him in the car and had run away. When asked if the men were his friends, Stoll denied it. He died on the way to the hospital.

== Investigation ==
The criminal investigation showed that Stoll was injured before the crash, and initially concluded that he had been hit by a car elsewhere, and subsequently positioned in the passenger's seat of his car and driven to the location where he was discovered. Contrary to his injuries, the damage to the car occurred at the location where the car was found.

It was also concluded that he was naked at the time he was supposedly run over. Other drivers reported seeing a hitchhiker at the Hagen-Süd exit. Neither the hitchhiker nor the person in the white jacket were identified. Suspicions regarding Stoll's holiday trips to the Netherlands, where he was thought to have made contact with drug dealers, proved unfounded.

Police were unable to recover the piece of paper with the letters "YOG'TZE". Stoll's wife stated that she threw the paper away the night Stoll died. As such, police cannot even confirm that "YOG'TZE" was exactly what Stoll had written;— ‌either way, the meaning of "YOG'TZE" remains unknown.

=== Closure of the case ===
In April 2025, Hagen Police and public prosecutor's office announced that the case is now being considered solved. New investigations had concluded that Stoll's injuries did not match him being driven over, but that they much more likely resulted from a car crash. Additionally, no DNA of people other than Stoll was found in the car, which led to the conclusion that he was alone in the car at the time of the accident and had caused the accident himself. Also, it was concluded that Stoll had psychological problems - he had been suffering from depression before and was probably in a psychological state of emergency, which would explain his strange behavior, as well as him being naked. Following these new findings, the case, which had still been treated as a murder case, was closed as a single-car traffic accident with outside interference ruled out. Whether the "YOG'TZE" paper really existed is disputed, and investigators doubt that it would be relevant for the case anyway.

== Television coverage ==
On 12 April 1985, the case was presented on the popular German television programme Aktenzeichen XY… ungelöst.

Upon airing, several amateur radio enthusiasts called the TV station, stating that by changing the G in "YOGTZE" to the number 6, one gets the official call sign of a Romanian radio station.
