= Hantan River =

River in the Korean peninsula

Coordinates: 38°00′17″N 127°00′39″E

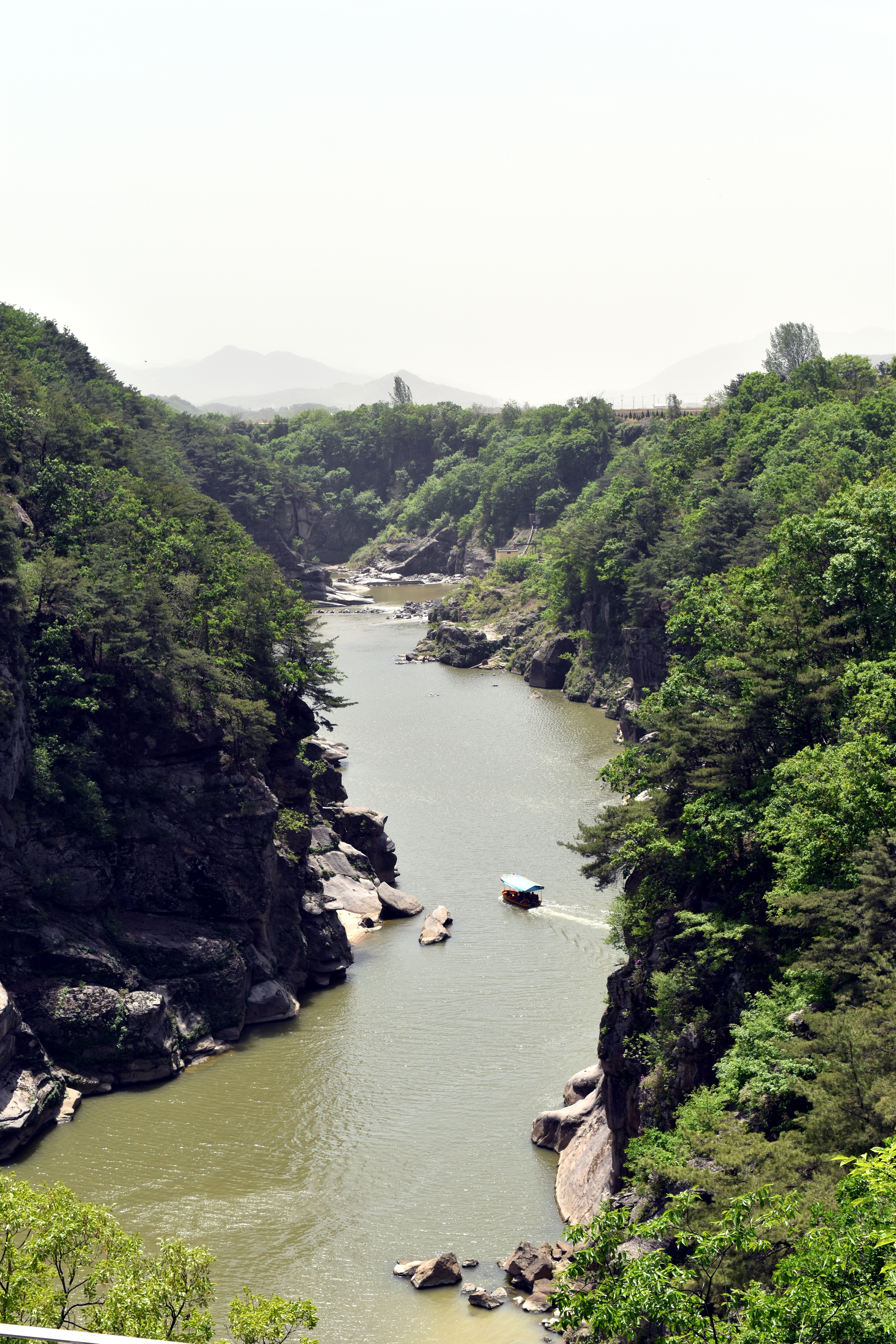
- near Goseokjeong (고석정)
- Hantan River

Location
- Country: South Korea (KOR), North Korea (PRK)
- Provinces: Gangwon Province (KOR), Gyeonggi Province (KOR), Pyonggang (PRK)

Physical characteristics
- Source: Pyonggang (PRK)
- Mouth: Imjin River
- Length: 136 km (85 mi)

Korean name
- Hangul: 한탄강
- Hanja: 漢灘江
- RR: Hantangang
- MR: Hant'an'gang

The Hantan (Korean: 한탄강) is a river flowing from Pyonggang County, North Korea across the border through Gangwon and Gyeonggi provinces in South Korea. It is a tributary of the Imjin River, which eventually joins the Han River and empties into the Yellow Sea. The Hantan River is a popular site for white-water rafting.

== Cheorwon Plain ==
Cheorwon Plain is an area along the river basins of the Imjin River and Hantangang River and was formed by volcanic activity. Many migratory birds use this area as a wintering place because warm water gushes from the ground in winter and surface waters do not freeze, making it easy to find food.

The plain was a fierce battleground in the Korean War and, with the ceasefire in 1953, it was designated as a civilian control area. With no humans permitted to use it, the area reverted to grass and shrubland and the marshlands and grasslands became important feeding and resting areas for migratory birds.

== History ==
The infectious agent Hantaan virus was first identified in the Hantan River area by Ho Wang Lee and others, and was named for the Hantan river, where the disease vector (a rat) was found. Because the original publication transliterated the river's name as "Hantaan," this spelling remains associated with the "Hantaan virus." The name is also applied to the virus genus Orthohantavirus (formerly Hantavirus), as well as its family Hantaviridae.

The construction of the Hantangang Dam began on its lower course in 2007 and was completed in mid-2015. The sole purpose of the dam is flood control. It was also a battleground in the Korean War, but the riverside is beautiful, so the Hantangang River National Tourist Resort was established.

== Geography and geology ==
The Hantan River passes through a mountainous area where there was volcanic activity in the Cenozoic Era and Quaternary, and Canyons and Cliffs are developed. In the past, volcanic activity occurred in this area and a large amount of basalt covered the Hantangang River area, forming the Cheorwon-Pyeonggang lava plateau. Later, the Hantangang River waters eroded the basalt, creating the deep canyons and basalt cliffs that exist today. The Hantangang River has tributaries such as Namdaecheon, Yeongpyeongcheon, and Chatancheon, and along with the Imjin River, it is a flat river with a gentle slope and has well-developed sandbanks. The minerals that form the ground in the canyon caused by volcanic activity in the Chugaryeong Rift Zone include porphyritic metamorphic gneiss, Proterozoic Yeoncheon metamorphic sedimentary rock, Mesozoic Era Jurassic granite flow and porphyritic granite, Cretaceous sedimentary rocks of the Shindong Formation Group, etc.

== Tourism and leisure ==
An old scenic spot on the Hantangang River is Goseokjeong, where Jinpyeong of Silla built a pavilion. Recently, the Hantangang River basin has been in the spotlight as a rafting location. As a leisure facility, there is the Hantangang River National Tourist Site.

== Natural monuments along the river ==
- Hantangang River Daegyocheon Basalt Canyon
- Pocheon Hantangang Basalt Canyon and Bidulginang Waterfall
- Pocheon Auraji Pillow Lava
- Jiktang waterfall

== Gallery ==
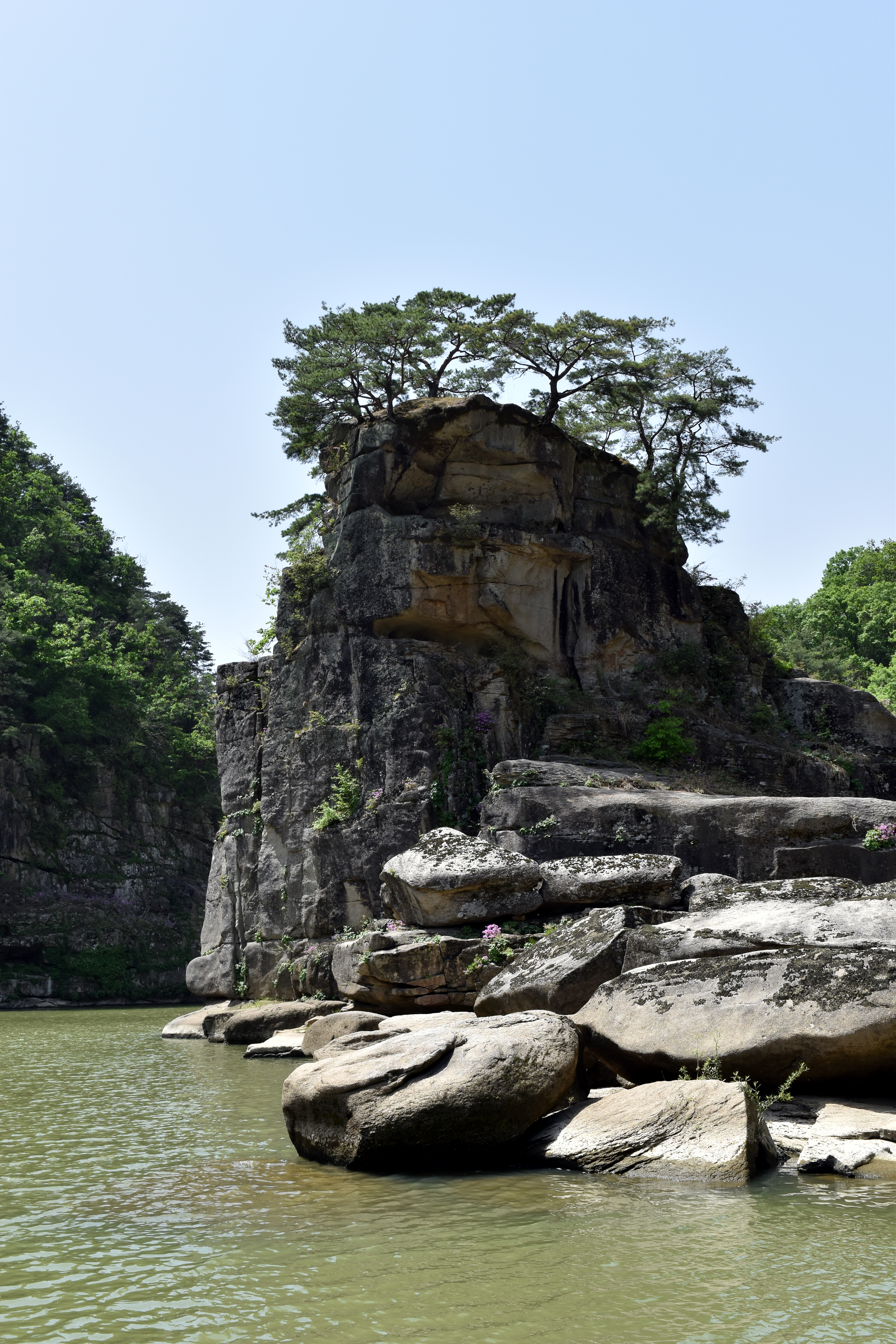
Goseokjeong

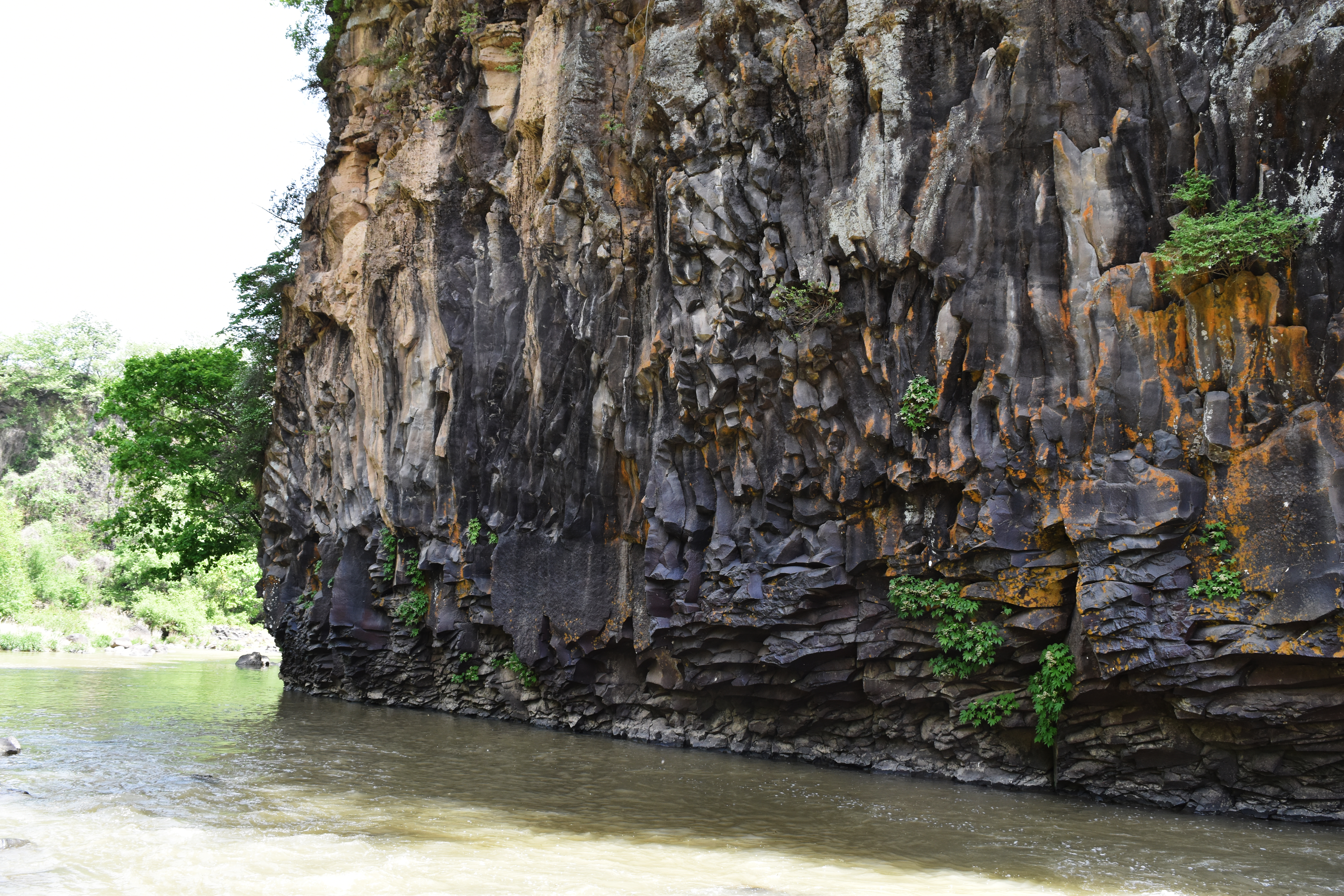
Basalt canyon Natural monument

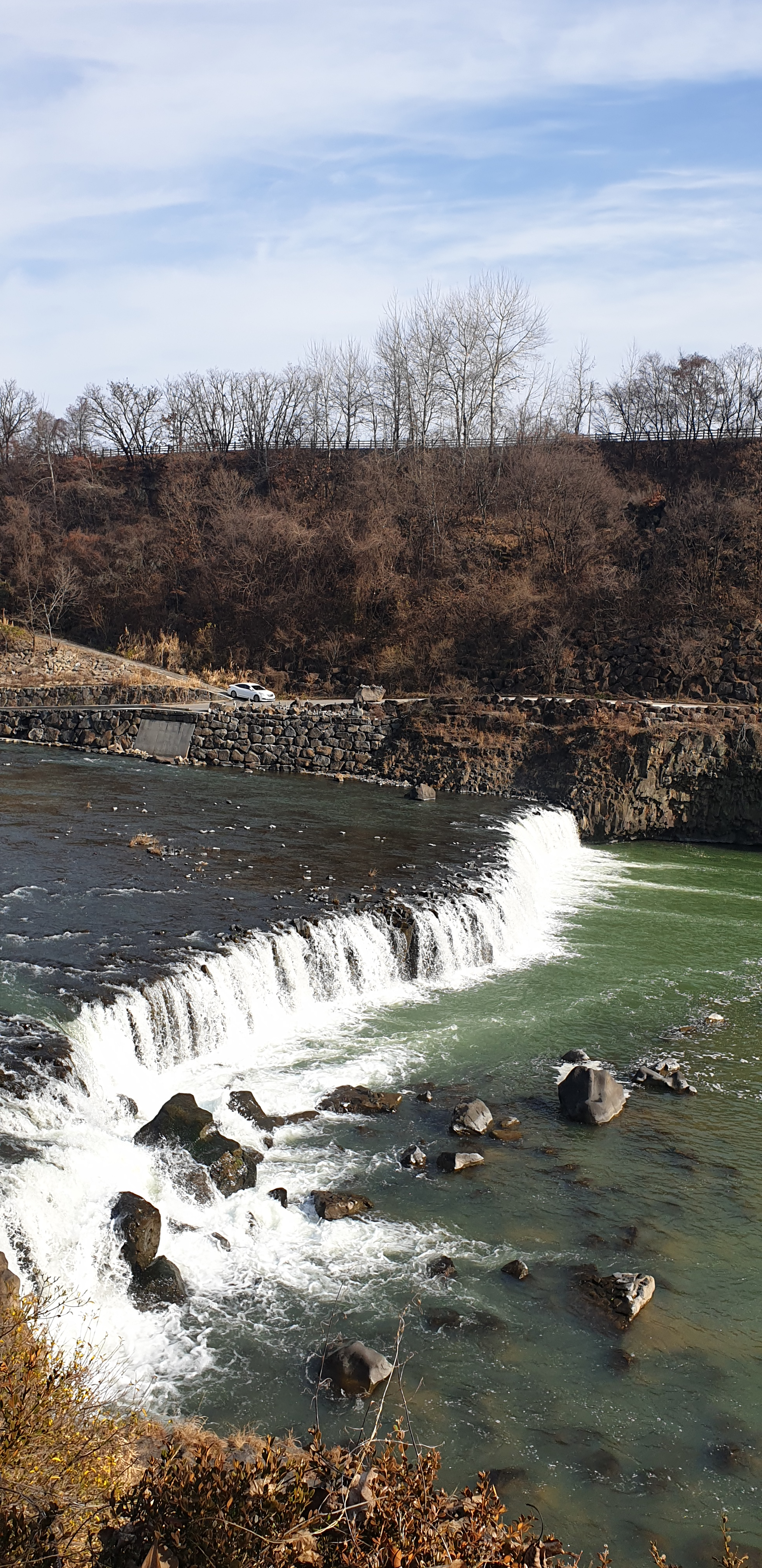
Jiktang falls

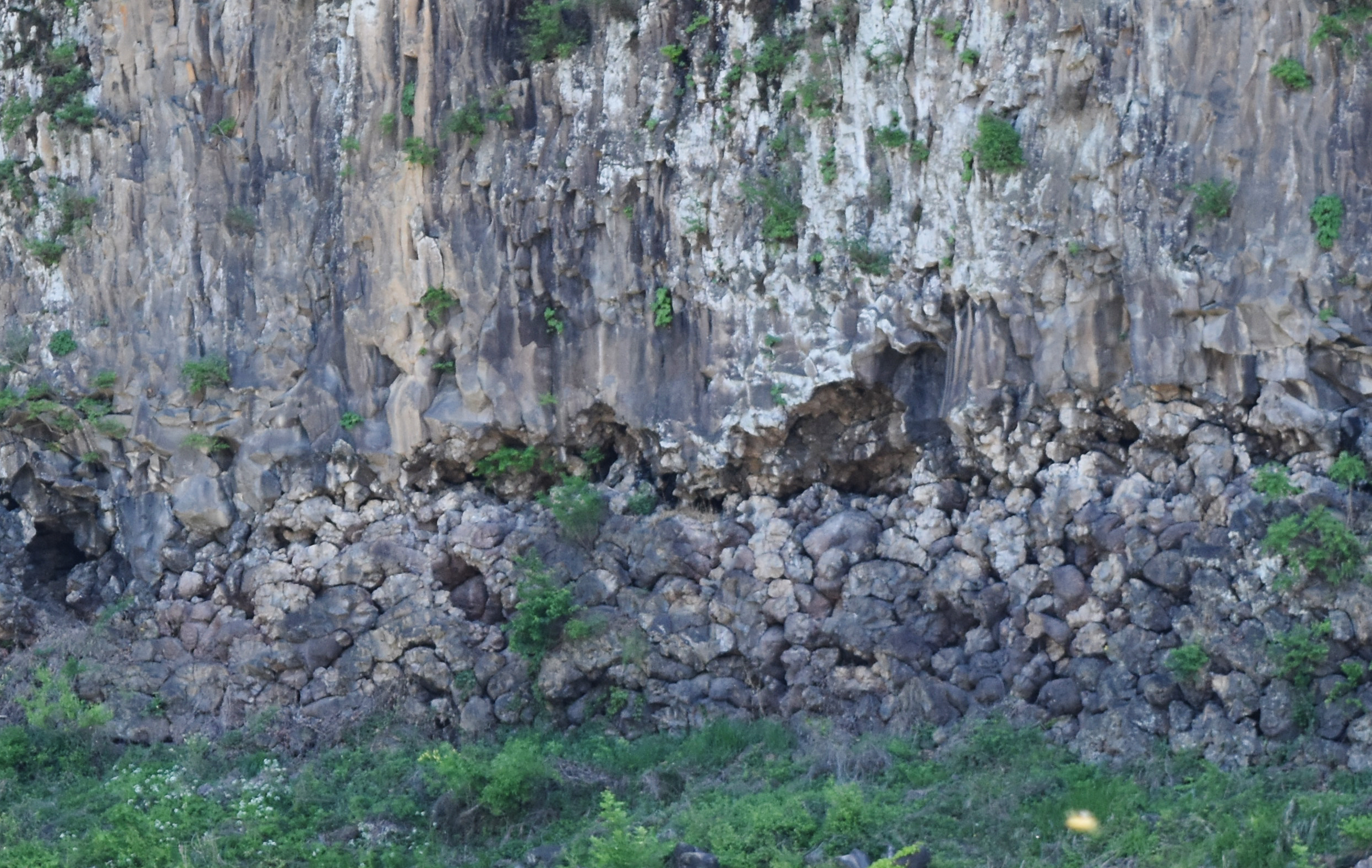
Pocheon Pillow Lava

== See also ==
- Rivers of Korea
