= Layer 8 =

Layer in the OSI model

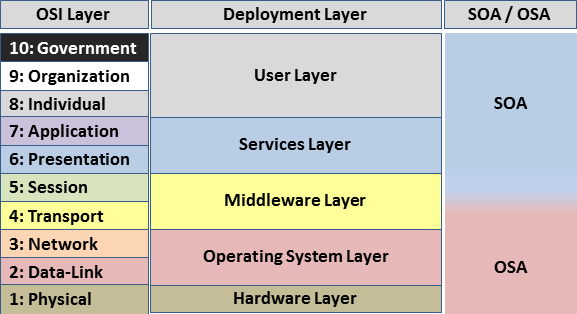

Layer 8 is a term used to refer to user or political layer on top of the 7-layer OSI model of computer networking.

The OSI model is a 7-layer abstract model that describes an architecture of data communications for networked computers. The layers build upon each other, allowing for the abstraction of specific functions in each one. The top (7th) layer is the Application Layer describing methods and protocols of software applications. It is then held that the user is the 8th layer.

== Layers, defined ==
Since the OSI layer numbers are commonly used to discuss networking topics, a troubleshooter may describe an issue caused by a user to be a layer 8 issue, similar to the PEBKAC acronym, the ID-Ten-T Error and also PICNIC.

Political economic theory holds that the 8th layer is important to understanding the OSI Model. Political policies such as network neutrality, spectrum management, and digital inclusion all shape the technologies comprising layers 1–7 of the OSI Model.

In the 1980s, a network guru T-shirt from the 1980s shows Layer 8 as the "financial" layer, and Layer 9 as the "political" layer. The design was credited to Evi Nemeth.

In 2003, Network World readers humorously proposed their own definitions:

- Layer 8: Money - Provides network corruption by inspiring increased interference from the upper layer.
- Layer 9: Politics - Consists of technically ignorant management that negatively impacts network performance and development.

and:

- Layer 9: Politics. "Where the most difficult problems live."
- Layer 8: The user factor. "It turned out to be another Layer-8 problem."
- 7 to 1: The usual OSI layers
- Layer 0: Funding. "Because we should always start troubleshooting from the lowest layer, and nothing can exist before the funding."

In 2010, Ian Farquhar of RSA proposed that additional layers could be defined in terms of the scale of the human organization involved:

- Layer 8: The individual person.
- Layer 9: The organization.
- Layer 10: Government or legal compliance

An 8th layer has also been referenced to physical (real-world) controllers containing an external hardware device which interacts with an OSI model network. An example of this is ALI in Profibus.

== Similar pseudo-layers for TCP/IP ==
In the TCP/IP model, the four-layer model of the Internet, a fifth layer is sometimes analogously described as the political layer, and the sixth as the religious layer. This appears in a humorous April Fools' Day RFC, RFC 2321, published in 1998.

== Other uses ==
- Linux Gazette carries a regular column called Layer 8 Linux Security.
- Layers 8, 9, and 10 are sometimes used to represent individuals, organizations, and governments for the user layer of service-oriented architectures. See OSI User Layers figure for details.
- User-in-the-loop is a serious concept including Layer 8 as a system-level model

== See also ==
- IRL
- Liveware
