= Blinking twelve problem =

When features are unusable due to their complexity

In software design, the blinking twelve problem is when features in software or computer systems are rendered unusable to most users by the complexity of the interface to them.

The usage emanates from the 'clock' feature provided on many VCRs manufactured in the late 1980s or early 1990s. The clock could be set by using a combination of buttons provided on the VCR in a specific sequence that was found complicated by most users. As a result, VCR users were known to seldom set the time on the VCR clock. This resulted in the default time of '12:00' blinking on the VCR display at all times of the day, which is the origin of this term.

'The blinking twelve problem' thus refers to any situation in which features or functions of a program go unused for reasons that the designers never anticipated, largely because developers were unable to anticipate the level of understanding the users would have of the technology. The term may also refer to the challenge faced by developers of addressing the real causes of users' difficulties, as well as the challenge of providing helpful documentation or technical support without knowing beforehand how well the user understands their own problem.

In other instances, it can be used to reference the lack of basic user-friendly features in complex systems, such as the lack of a backup battery to keep the clock setting in a $300 VCR during even the briefest power interruption, when a $10 clock would have one.
