= User error =

Error made by the human user of a complex system

A user error is an error made by the human user of a complex system, usually a computer system, in interacting with it. Although the term is sometimes used by human–computer interaction practitioners, the more formal term human error is used in the context of human reliability.

Related terms such as PEBKAC ("problem exists between keyboard and chair"), PEBMAC ("problem exists between monitor and chair"), identity error or ID-10T/1D-10T error ("idiot error"), PICNIC ("problem in chair, not in computer"), IBM error ("idiot behind machine error"), skill issue ("lack of skill"), and other similar phrases are also used as slang in technical circles with derogatory meaning. This usage implies a lack of computer savviness, asserting that problems arising when using a device are the fault of the user. Critics of the term argue that many problems are caused instead by poor product designs that fail to anticipate the capabilities and needs of the user.

The term can also be used for non-computer-related mistakes.

== Causes ==
Joel Spolsky points out that users usually do not pay full attention to the computer system while using it. He suggests compensating for this when building usable systems, thus allowing a higher percentage of users to complete tasks without errors:

For example, suppose the goal of your program is to allow people to convert digital camera photos into a web photo album. If you sit down a group of average users with your program and ask them all to complete this task, then the more usable your program is, the higher the percentage of users that will be able to successfully create a web photo album. To be scientific about it, imagine 100 real world users. They are not necessarily familiar with computers. They have many diverse talents, but some of them distinctly do not have talents in the computer area. Some of them are being distracted while they try to use your program. The phone is ringing. The baby is crying. And the cat keeps jumping on the desk and batting around the mouse.

Now, even without going through with this experiment, I can state with some confidence that some of the users will simply fail to complete the task, or will take an extraordinary amount of time doing it.

Experts in interaction design such as Alan Cooper believe this concept puts blame in the wrong place, the user, instead of blaming the error-inducing design and its failure to take into account human limitations. Bruce "Tog" Tognazzini describes an anecdote of Dilbert creator Scott Adams losing a significant amount of work of comment moderation at his blog due to a poorly constructed application that conveyed a wrong mental model, even though the user took explicit care to preserve the data.

Jef Raskin advocated designing devices in ways that prevent erroneous actions.

Don Norman suggests changing the common technical attitude towards user error:

Don't think of the user as making errors; think of the actions as approximations of what is desired.

== Acronyms and other names ==
Terms like PEBMAC/PEBCAK or an ID10T error are often used by tech support operators and computer experts to describe a user error as a problem that is attributed to the user's ignorance instead of a software or hardware malfunction. These phrases are used as a humorous way to describe user errors. A highly popularized example of this is a user mistaking their CD-ROM tray for a cup holder, or a user looking for the "any key". However, any variety of stupidity or ignorance-induced problems can be described as user errors.

=== PEBKAC/POBCAK/PICNIC ===
Phrases used by the tech savvy to mean that a problem is caused entirely by the fault of the user include PEBKAC (an acronym for "problem exists between keyboard and chair"), PEBCAK (an alternative, but similar, acronym for "problem exists between chair and keyboard"), POBCAK (a US government/military acronym for "problem occurs between chair and keyboard"), PICNIC ("problem in chair not in computer"), "cockpit error", and EBKAC ("Error between keyboard and chair"). Another variant is PEBUAK (Problem Exists Between User and Keyboard).

In 2006, Intel began running a number of PEBCAK web-based advertisements to promote its vPro platform.

If the same sentiment wants to be conveyed without using an acronym, the phrase "chair to keyboard interface error" is often used.

=== ID-10-T error ===
ID-Ten-T error (also seen as ID10T and ID107) is a masked jab at the user: when ID-Ten-T is spelled out it becomes ID10T ("IDIOT"). It is also known as a "Ten-T error" or "ID:10T error". The User Friendly comic strip presented this usage in a cartoon on 11 February 1999.

In United States Navy and Army slang, the term has a similar meaning, though it is pronounced differently:

- The Navy pronounces ID10T as "eye dee ten tango".
- The Army instead uses the word 1D10T which it pronounces as "one delta ten tango".

=== In other languages ===
In Danish, it is called a Fejl 40, or 'error 40', indicating that the error was 40 centimetres (16 in) from the device. Swedish has a similar expression, Felkod 60, referring to the error being 60 centimeters away from the device.

In Swedish, the phrase skit bakom spakarna ('shit behind the levers') or skit bakom styret ('shit behind the steering wheel') or the abbreviation SBS-problem is used. A variant used in the ICT domain is skit bakom tangenterna/tangentbordet ('shit behind the keys/keyboard') abbreviated SBT.

In French, it is described as an ICC problem (interface chaise–clavier), a problem with the keyboard–chair interface, very similarly to the PEBKAC.

In Québec, it is called a Cas-18, indicating that the error was 18 inches (46 cm) from the device. Better known as 'code-18'.

In Brazilian Portuguese, it is often called a BIOS problem (bicho ignorante operando o sistema), translated as 'ignorant animal operating the system', or a USB error (usuário super burro), translated as 'super dumb user'.

In Spanish, some call it 'Error 200' (error doscientos), because it rhymes with the explanation. When asked for the full explanation, it's often offered as "sí, error 200, entre la mesa y el asiento" ('yeah, error 200, between the desk and the seat'). Other multiples of 100 also work because of the same rhyme. Also called Error de capa 8 (8th layer error) referring to the OSI Protocol layers when the user is the one who caused the error, for example El servidor no es accesible por un error de capa 8 (Server is not accessible due to an 8th layer error) when users can not access a server because they typed in the wrong password.

In German, it is called a DAU (dümmster anzunehmender User), literally translated as 'dumbest assumed user', referring to the common engineering acronym GAU (größter anzunehmender Unfall), for a maximum credible accident, or worst-case scenario.

In Bulgarian, it is called a "Problem with behind-keyboard device" (Проблем със задклавиатурното устройство).

=== In subcultures ===
The computing jargon refers to "wetware bugs" as the user is considered part of the system, in a hardware/software/wetware layering.

The automotive repair persons' version is referring to the cause of a problem as a "faulty steering actuator", "broken linkage between the seat and the steering wheel", "loose nut between the steering wheel and the seat," or more simply, "loose nut behind the wheel." Similarly, typewriter repair people used to refer to "a loose nut behind the keyboard" or a "defective keyboard controller."

The broadcast engineering or amateur radio version is referred to as a "short between the headphones". Another term used in public safety two-way radio (i.e. police, fire, ambulance, etc.) is a "defective PTT button actuator".

Another similar term used in the United States military is "operator headspace and timing issue" or "OHT," borrowing terminology related to the operation of the M2 Browning machine gun.

"(It's a) carbon based error", indicates a user problem (humans are a carbon-based life-form), as opposed to a silicon-based one.

Some support technicians refer to it as "biological interface error".

The networking administrators' version is referring to the cause of a problem as a "layer 8 issue", referring to the "user" or "political" layer on top of the seven-layer OSI model of computer networking.

In video game culture, user error is sometimes referred to as a "skill issue", often as a retort to the player complaining about the game's perceived unfairness.

== See also ==
- Error message
- Idiot-proof
- Latent human error
- Luser – Local user, or loser
- Mode error
- RTFM
- Social engineering
- Pilot error
- Undo
