= Newbie =

Slang term for a novice or newcomer

Newbie (Note: Also newb, noob, newby, newbie, newbee, noobie, n00b, nub, and nubie.) is a slang term for a novice, newcomer, or somebody inexperienced in a given profession or activity. In particular, it may refer to a new user of computers, and often concerns Internet activity, such as online gaming or Linux use.

The origin of this term is uncertain. Earliest uses probably date to late twentieth century United States Armed Forces jargon, though possible precursor terms date much earlier. The related term noob (often stylized as n00b) is frequently used in online gaming.

== History ==
The etymology of the term is uncertain. It may derive from "newie", which is attested in U.S. and Australian sources of the 1850s, meaning a neophyte in a place or situation; alternatively, it may derive from the British public school slang "new boy" or "new blood", which is attributed to the same era and was applied to a schoolboy in his first term.

In the 1960s and 1970s, the term "newbie" had a limited usage among U.S. troops in the Vietnam War as a slang term for a new man in a unit.

Another use of the term newbie was the moniker given to new U.S. Navy recruit students attending Basic Electricity and Electronics school by more senior students, a requisite course prior to enrollment in the A-school course at Naval Air Technical Training Center, Millington, Tennessee.

The earliest appearance of the term on the Internet may have been on the Usenet newsgroup talk.bizarre. By 1988, it had already entered online usage.

Coming from an oral tradition, the term has various spellings. Among alternative forms are "newby", "nubie", and "newbee" (e.g. Los Angeles Times of August 1985: "It had to do with newbees. I could be wrong on the spelling, but newbies are the rookies among the Blue Angels.").

In 2000, Electronic Arts released The Sims. The game featured a tutorial house with a family called The Newbies.

== Connotations of variants ==
Different spellings can have quite different connotations; so in some contexts a "newb" refers to a beginner who is willing to learn, while a "noob" refers disparagingly to an inexperienced or under-talented hacker or gamer who lacks the determination to learn.

== Similar terms in other languages ==
- In Korean, the equivalent term is chobo or hasu, the opposite of gosu, meaning "highly skilled".
- In Chinese, cainiao (simplified Chinese: 菜鸟; traditional Chinese: 菜鳥; pinyin: càiniǎo; lit. 'vegetable bird'). It either originated from Hong Kong or from the Taiwanese army. It became an Internet slang term used in the Chinese-speaking community.

== See also ==
- FNG, another term for someone new to a unit used in the Vietnam War
- Luser, a pejorative term for inexperienced computer users
