= FrontDoor =

FrontDoor was one of the most popular mailers in the FidoNet-compatible networks in the 1990s, acting as the physical representation of the written network node connection and mail handling standards. It was an MS-DOS-based product (also available as shareware) written by Joaquim Homrighausen (alias JoHo). The FrontDoor system contained a Mailer, an Editor, a Terminal, a serial port device driver and configuration utilities. FrontDoor was first released in 1986.

The task of mailers, the main task of the first FrontDoor release, was to accept a phone call for a BBS / FidoNet node system; differentiating between human and machine calls (sending the humans to the BBS while handling all other cases) and if the other end supported the same protocol started a conversation about handling whatever packets had to be exchanged, and calling external programs to handle the traffic.

Originally FrontDoor was a small utility to handle incoming calls, written in 1986. Peter Adenauer of AMS Applied Micro Systems, Inc. of Miami, Florida asked Homrighausen in 1987 to leave his job at Ericsson and come to the US and start developing a commercial product based on FrontDoor with Peter Stewart. After several adventurous clashes between the programmers and the company and realising that there wasn't a useful product even after a long development the people parted: Homrighausen went to Australia with the version 1.99c source code while Stewart got the same code which has been used as the basis of InterMail software.

FrontDoor continued its life as shareware as well as a commercial product; the current versions are 2.26 (DOS+OS/2 shareware) and 2.32.mL (DOS+OS/2 multiline commercial). Joaquim Homrighausen attempted a "revival" of sorts of the project in 2014, but was prevented from continuing due to rehab from an injury. In August 2017, he once again began reviving the product, some 30+ years after the first release. As of September 2017, it is still unclear as to which platforms the re-booted FrontDoor project will run on.

In December 2024, Joaquim Homrighausen managed to find all the required source code and tools to re-build FrontDoor once again. Version 24.01 was released as "free for non-commercial use", with all features enabled. This also marks the end of the "multiline/commercial" and "shareware" versions of FrontDoor. Registration is optional.

== Technical aspects ==
FrontDoor runs under DOS and OS/2 as well as under most DOS-based multi-tasking environment (like Windows, DESQview, DoubleDOS, and more). It has also been successfully used in environments like DOSBox-X, NTVDM (Windows 10, 32-bit), FreeDOS, and more.

File transfer protocols supported by FrontDoor are Zmodem, Zmodem/CRC-32, Telink, SEAlink, SEAlink Overdrive, and Xmodem/CRC.

=== Technical specifications ===
FrontDoor consists of:

- a Mailer,
- an Editor,
- a Terminal (TTY, VT-52, VT-100, ANSI X3.64 and AVATAR/0+; IEMSI profiles to login),
- a serial port device driver, and
- configuration utilities (FDSETUP, FDNC, etc.)

FrontDoor features:

- Support for DOS-based multitasking environments (DR Multiuser DOS, Novell NetWare, LANtastic, POWERLan, MS LAN Manager, DESQview, PC/MOS-386, DoubleDOS, OS/2, Windows 3.xx, Windows 95/98/ME, Windows XP)
- The ability to handle a virtually unlimited amount of destinations, names and phone numbers (theoretically 1.2 × 10^{20} entries)
- The file transfer protocols ZModem/CRC-32, ZModem, Telink, SEAlink Overdrive, SEAlink, and XModem/CRC with no size limit (apart from DOS limits)
- Comprehensive mail management and editing, including filtering functions
- Support for a temporary DOS shell in nearly every point in the program (which swaps itself out)
- Enhanced keyboard layouts in the editor and a huge number of macro key sets
- Printer handling for mail
- A flexible scheduler for the mailer component
- Destination-based modem reconfiguration
- Dynamic and flexible mail routing
- FAX handling

=== Hardware requirements ===
It is interesting to compare its system requirements with today's software:

- IBM PC, AT, 386, 486, PS/2 or 100% BIOS compatible
- A hard disk with minimum 1 Megabyte of disk space
- An asynchronous telephone modem (Hayes compatible)
- A monochrome video card
- 384 kB system memory
- MS or PC DOS 3.10 or above
- A FOSSIL driver (standardised modem handling; examples: X00, BNU, OpusComm, cFos, VX00, DGFossil or VFD)
- XMS and EMS memory optional
- AT-style keyboard
