= JAM Message Base Format =

DOS file format

The JAM Message Base Format was one of the most popular file formats of message bases on DOS-based BBSes in the 1990s. JAM stands for "Joaquim-Andrew-Mats" after the original authors of the API, Joaquim Homrighausen, Andrew Milner, Mats Birch, and Mats Wallin. Joaquim was the author of FrontDoor, a DOS-based FidoNet-compatible mailer. Andrew was the author of RemoteAccess, a popular DOS-based Bulletin Board System. JAM was originally released in 1993 in C, however the most popular implementation was Mark May's "MK Source for Msg Access" written in Pascal which also saw its initial release in 1993.

== BBS software ==
- EleBBS
- Ezycom
- LoraBBS
- MBSE
- Mystic BBS
- Nexus BBS
- RemoteAccess
- ProBoard
- TAG (BBS)
- TCRA32
- Telegard
- Tornado BBS

== Mail import/export software ==
- AllFix - File Tosser (can read control messages from and post messages into a JAM messagebase)
- Altair - FTN tosser
- Crashmail II - A portable FidoNet tosser for JAM messagebases
- FastEcho - FTN tosser
- FMail - FTN tosser
- GEcho - FTN tosser
- HPT (Fidonet) - FTN tosser
- IMail - FTN tosser
- Mystic BBS - BBS software with built in JAM import/export
- Partoss (Parma tosser) - FTN tosser
- Regina-Tosser/2
- TosScan - FTN tosser
- SHUT UP AND RUN THE MAIL - QWK Mail Tosser
- WaterGate
- xMail 1.00 - FTN tosser

== Mail reading/editing software ==
- FrontDoor FM - Sysop's local access reader/editor from FrontDoor package
- FrontDoor APX - Integrated reader/editor from FrontDoor APX package
- GoldED - Sysop's local access reader/editor
- Hector/DOS
- RAVIP
- ReadMsg - BBS door that replaces builtin message base option
- TheReader v4.50 - BBS door that replaces builtin message base option
- TimED - Sysop's local access reader/editor
- WebJammer

== Offline QWK/Bluewave software ==
- Bluewave
- Jc-QWK
- OffLine Message System (OLMS2000)

== Mail posting tools ==
(this software posts ASCII text files to JAM bases as messages)

- ChargePost
- JPost
- MPost
- PostIt - posts text files to local, netmail, and echomail areas
- RemoteAccess Automated Message System (RAMS) - posts welcome, thanks for the upload, and similar automated messages to users
- WriteJAM

== Statistics tools ==
(this software gathers statistical information)

- JAMStat - statistics bulletin generator
- MyMail
- QRatio
- ReadDetect
- Traffic v1.10

== Maintenance tools ==
- Automatic Maintenance Pro
- CVTMSG10
- Ftrack and RNtrack - netmail tracker (netmail manager)
- Itrack - netmail tracker (netmail manager)
- MK Message Utilities - convert between JAM and other message base formats
- MNTrack - netmail tracker (netmail manager)
- NetMgr 1.00 - netmail manager
- The NetMail Importer (NetImp)
- Y2Ktool - Fido Year 2000 Tools Rel. 6

== Mail tools and utility software ==
(this software fills some other utilitarian need not covered in another category listing) (some of this software is listed here because it hasn't been categorized)

- AMC
- Fidonet Awk Utility
- FMACopy
- MailBox 1.05
- MessageBase Reporter
- MSGRA
- MSGRead 2.20
- OM and OMlite
- RACD
- VPJAM
- XSH

== Other JAM capable software ==
- JamNNTPd - Jam based NNTP server, uses the JAM message format
- Message Base Spy - message base research, troubleshooting and development tool

== See also ==
- Squish
