= SuperBBS =

- Original authors: Aki Antman and Risto Virkkala
- Initial release: 1990; 35 years ago
- Stable release: v1.17-3 / February 13, 1993; 32 years ago
- Operating system: DOS
- Type: Bulletin Board System
- License: Shareware

SuperBBS is a DOS Bulletin Board System (BBS) software package written by Aki Antman and Risto Virkkala. It was born as a functional clone of RemoteAccess BBS (which in turn was a clone of QuickBBS), but extended the functionality with several newer technology a different way from RA. SuperBBS offered news, email, file sharing, discussion forums, realtime chat etc. and was used in more than 40 countries. It has been distributed as shareware.

SuperBBS supported Hudson type messagebase, USERS.BBS style userbase, flexible menu and textfile options to make the software highly customisable. Supported several style doorway (external) programs and utilities written for QuickBBS, RemoteAccess and ProBoard.

The development ceased when Antman entered the Finnish army in 1993 and decided not to continue the development.
