= BNU =

BNU may refer to:

- BNU (software), a communications driver.
- Banco Nacional Ultramarino, a Portuguese and Macanese bank
- Beaconhouse National University, a university in Lahore, Pakistan
- Beijing Normal University, a university in Beijing, China
- Bibliothèque nationale et universitaire, public library in Strasbourg
- Brooklyn Northern United AFC, a New Zealand football team
- Buckinghamshire New University, a university in Buckinghamshire, England
- Bengaluru North University, a university in Karnataka, India
