= 90.0 FM =

FM radio frequency

The following radio stations broadcast on FM frequency 90 MHz:

== China ==
- CNR Music Radio in Beijing
- CNR The Voice of China in Maoming
- alternative frequency for Wuhan News Radio (formerly CRI News Radio, converted in 2020)

== Germany ==
- BR24 news station (with Data Radio Channel) in Munich, Bavaria

== Indonesia ==
- Elshinta News and Talk in Jakarta

== Israel ==
Radio 90FM in Hefer Valley

== Tonga ==
- Radio Tonga 2/Kool 90 FM

== United Kingdom ==
- BBC Radio 2 (Sandgate, Kent transmitter)
- BBC Radio Shropshire in Church Stretton
- YO1 Radio in Selby

== UAE ==
The United Arab Emirates Radio From Abu Dhabi
