= G.706 =

In telecommunications, G.706 is an ITU-T standard that relates to equipment which receives signals with basic frame structures as defined in Recommendation G.704. It was approved in 1991.

G.706 standard defines the frame alignment, the cyclic redundancy check(CRC), multiframe alignment and CRC bit error monitoring procedures to be used by such equipment.
