= RemoteAccess =

DOS-based bulletin-board system

- The RemoteAccess waiting for caller screen.
- Original author: Andrew Milner
- Developer: Bruce Morse
- Release: 1989; 37 years ago
- Stable release: 2.62.2 / October 25, 2000; 25 years ago
- Written in: Turbo Pascal with some Assembly Language routines
- Operating system: DOS
- Size: 829 KB
- Available in: Dutch, English, Finnish, German, Spanish, Swedish
- Type: Bulletin Board System
- License: Shareware
- Website: www.rapro.com

RemoteAccess is a DOS Bulletin Board System (BBS) software package written by Andrew Milner and published by his company Wantree Development in Australia. RemoteAccess was written in Turbo Pascal with some Assembly Language routines. RemoteAccess (commonly called RA) began in 1989 as a clone of QuickBBS by Adam Hudson. It was released under the shareware concept in 1990 and became popular in North America, Europe, UK, South Africa, and the South Pacific. Initially the main advantage over QuickBBS was its ability to run multiple nodes under Microsoft Windows, Quarterdeck's DESQview and OS/2. RA could also operate over a network or even a combination of network and multitasking operating systems to provide multiple "nodes per station" capabilities.

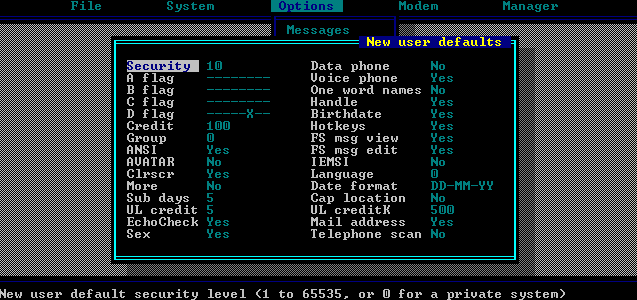
RAConfig - RemoteAccess configuration utility

RA's features quickly grew to become considerably more advanced than the QuickBBS software from which it was cloned. A number of other QuickBBS clones appeared shortly afterwards including ProBoard, SuperBBS and EzyCom, though they never gained as much support or popularity. RA was the first BBS software to support the popular JAM Message Base Format, which was partly conceived by RA's author, Andrew Milner. RA was also the first shareware BBS software to support a FDB (file database), rather than using files.bbs text files to describe files in each directory. RA interfaced with message relaying systems such as FidoNet through 3rd party utilities such as FrontDoor (Joaquim Homrighausen), MainDoor (Francisco Sedano) and FastEcho (Tobias Burchhardt), which were developed by people who eventually became members of the RA beta team.

With over 1500 titles, there were more third party utilities written for RA than for any other shareware BBS software. While RA was initially shareware, Andrew also released a commercial edition - "RemoteAccess Professional" - that was bundled with utilities to allow remote control of nodes over a network (RANETMGR, and RATSR).

Andrew Milner released his final version of RA (2.50) in May 1996. By that time, many System Operators switched over from running Bulletin Boards to becoming Internet Service Providers. Milner was one such System Operator, and after version 2.50 he stopped development. In April 1997, Milner put the rights and source code up for sale to the highest bidder and it was sold in December 1997 to Bruce Morse in the USA. Morse released some minor updates including a Y2K fix, but did not add any new features to the code. Morse's final version (2.62) was released in August 2000. Bruce Morse continues to own the code today and RA is still available as shareware, as well as a commercial version known as RemoteAccess-Professional.

RemoteAccess was never ported to a 32-bit version, but there were two clones of RA in the later years which did include 32-bit versions: EleBBS in the late 1990s which included DOS, Windows, OS/2 and Linux flavors, and MBSE, a few years later, which focused mainly on the Linux operating system.

There were numerous conversations about creating Windows and OS/2 32-bit versions of RA around 1995. Joel Ricketts of Interscape Development, who was the lead programmer, answered questions in the RA echomail forum about the potential development of RA for Windows during this time. However, due to RA being put up for sale, as well as lack of funding, the project was scrapped in 1996.

Around the same time, Niels Schoot from the Netherlands began writing a Visual Basic version of RA called tcRA32, which was to be fully RA compatible. The project was never finished, and within a couple of years, it was abandoned.

While RemoteAccess never included internal telnet support, it can be run as a telnet BBS by using a telnet-FOSSIL driver such as NetFoss, or a Virtual COM port engine such as NetSerial under Windows, or using SIO/VMODEM under OS/2.

== BBSs running RemoteAccess ==
- Cosmo's Castle, a RemoteAccess BBS started in 1993 in West Virginia
- Dark Systems BBS (started in 1992 in the 705 Canadian area code). Telnet bbs.dsbbs.ca:23
- FutureDreams BBS (started in 1993 in Zwolle, The Netherlands)
- STI BBS (started in 1994 in São Paulo, Brazil)

== See also ==
- List of BBS software
