= Cyclic redundancy check =

Error-detecting code for detecting data changes

A cyclic redundancy check (CRC) is an error-detecting code commonly used in digital networks and storage devices to detect accidental changes to digital data. Blocks of data entering these systems get a short check value attached, based on the remainder of a polynomial division of their contents. On retrieval, the calculation is repeated and, in the event the check values do not match, corrective action can be taken against data corruption. CRCs can be used for error correction (see bitfilters).

CRCs are so called because the check (data verification) value is a redundancy (it expands the message without adding information) and the algorithm is based on cyclic codes. CRCs are popular because they are simple to implement in binary hardware, easy to analyze mathematically, and particularly good at detecting common errors caused by noise in transmission channels. Because the check value has a fixed length, the function that generates it is occasionally used as a hash function.

== Introduction ==
CRCs are based on the theory of cyclic error-correcting codes. The use of systematic cyclic codes, which encode messages by adding a fixed-length check value, for the purpose of error detection in communication networks, was first proposed by W. Wesley Peterson in 1961. Cyclic codes are not only simple to implement but have the benefit of being particularly well suited for the detection of burst errors: contiguous sequences of erroneous data symbols in messages. This is important because burst errors are common transmission errors in many communication channels, including magnetic and optical storage devices. Typically an n-bit CRC applied to a data block of arbitrary length will detect any single error burst not longer than n bits, and the fraction of all longer error bursts that it will detect is approximately (1 − 2^{−n}).

Specification of a CRC code requires definition of a so-called generator polynomial. This polynomial becomes the divisor in a polynomial long division, which takes the message as the dividend and in which the quotient is discarded and the remainder becomes the result. The important caveat is that the polynomial coefficients are calculated according to the arithmetic of a finite field, so the addition operation can always be performed bitwise-parallel (there is no carry between digits).

In practice, all commonly used CRCs employ the finite field of two elements, GF(2). The two elements are usually called 0 and 1, comfortably matching computer architecture.

A CRC is called an n-bit CRC when its check value is n bits long. For a given n, multiple CRCs are possible, each with a different polynomial. Such a polynomial has highest degree n, which means it has n + 1 terms. In other words, the polynomial has a length of n + 1; its encoding requires n + 1 bits. Note that most polynomial specifications either drop the MSb or LSb, since they are always 1. The CRC and associated polynomial typically have a name of the form CRC-n-XXX as in the table below.

The simplest error-detection system, the parity bit, is in fact a 1-bit CRC: it uses the generator polynomial x + 1 (two terms), and has the name CRC-1.

== Application ==
A CRC-enabled device calculates a short, fixed-length binary sequence, known as the check value or CRC, for each block of data to be sent or stored and appends it to the data, forming a codeword.

When a codeword is received or read, the device either compares its check value with one freshly calculated from the data block, or equivalently, performs a CRC on the whole codeword and compares the resulting check value with an expected residue constant.

If the CRC values do not match, then the block contains a data error.

The device may take corrective action, such as rereading the block or requesting that it be sent again. Otherwise, the data is assumed to be error-free (though, with some small probability, it may contain undetected errors; this is inherent in the nature of error-checking).

== Data integrity ==
CRCs are specifically designed to protect against common types of errors on communication channels, where they can provide quick and reasonable assurance of the integrity of messages delivered. However, they are not suitable for protecting against intentional alteration of data.

Firstly, as there is no authentication, an attacker can edit a message and recompute the CRC without the substitution being detected. When stored alongside the data, CRCs and cryptographic hash functions by themselves do not protect against intentional modification of data. Any application that requires protection against such attacks must use cryptographic authentication mechanisms, such as message authentication codes or digital signatures (which are commonly based on cryptographic hash functions).

Secondly, unlike cryptographic hash functions, CRC is an easily reversible function, which makes it unsuitable for use in digital signatures.

Thirdly, CRC satisfies a relation similar to that of a linear function (or more accurately, an affine function):

$$\operatorname{CRC}(x \oplus y) = \operatorname{CRC}(x) \oplus \operatorname{CRC}(y) \oplus c$$

where $c$ depends on the length of $x$ and $y$. This can be also stated as follows, where $x$, $y$ and $z$ have the same length

$$\operatorname{CRC}(x \oplus y \oplus z) = \operatorname{CRC}(x) \oplus \operatorname{CRC}(y) \oplus \operatorname{CRC}(z);$$

as a result, even if the CRC is encrypted with a stream cipher that uses XOR as its combining operation (or mode of block cipher which effectively turns it into a stream cipher, such as OFB or CFB), both the message and the associated CRC can be manipulated without knowledge of the encryption key; this was one of the well-known design flaws of the Wired Equivalent Privacy (WEP) protocol.

== Computation ==
To compute an n-bit binary CRC, line the bits representing the input in a row, and position the (n + 1)-bit pattern representing the CRC's divisor (called a "polynomial") underneath the left end of the row.

In this example, we shall encode 14 bits of message with a 3-bit CRC, with a polynomial x^{3} + x + 1. The polynomial is written in binary as the coefficients; a 3rd-degree polynomial has 4 coefficients (1x^{3} + 0x^{2} + 1x + 1). In this case, the coefficients are 1, 0, 1 and 1. The result of the calculation is 3 bits long, which is why it is called a 3-bit CRC. However, 4 bits are needed to explicitly state the polynomial.

Start with the message to be encoded:

11010011101100

This is first padded with zeros corresponding to the bit length n of the CRC. This is done so that the resulting code word is in systematic form. Here is the first calculation for computing a 3-bit CRC:

11010011101100 000 <--- input padded by 3 bits from the right
1011               <--- divisor (4 bits) = x^3 + x + 1
------------------
01100011101100 000 <--- result

The algorithm acts on the bits directly above the divisor in each step. The result for that iteration is the bitwise XOR of the polynomial divisor with the bits above it. The bits not above the divisor are simply copied directly below for that step. The divisor is then shifted right to align with the highest remaining 1 bit in the input, and the process is repeated until the divisor reaches the right-hand end of the input row. Here is the entire calculation:

11010011101100 000 <--- input padded by 3 bits from the right
1011               <--- divisor
01100011101100 000 <--- result (the first four bits are the XOR with the divisor beneath, the rest of the bits are unchanged)
 1011              <--- divisor ...
00111011101100 000
  1011
00010111101100 000
   1011
00000001101100 000 <--- the divisor moves over to align with the next 1 in the dividend (since quotient for that step was zero)
       1011             (in other words, it doesn't necessarily move one bit per iteration)
00000000110100 000
        1011
00000000011000 000
         1011
00000000001110 000
          1011
00000000000101 000
           101 1
-----------------
00000000000000 100 <--- remainder (3 bits).  Division algorithm stops here as dividend is equal to zero.

Since the leftmost divisor bit zeroed every input bit it touched, when this process ends the only bits in the input row that can be nonzero are the n bits at the right-hand end of the row. These n bits are the remainder of the division step, and will also be the value of the CRC function (unless the chosen CRC specification calls for some postprocessing).

The validity of a received message can easily be verified by performing the above calculation again, this time with the check value added instead of zeroes. The remainder should equal zero if there are no detectable errors.

11010011101100 100 <--- input with check value
1011               <--- divisor
01100011101100 100 <--- result
 1011              <--- divisor ...
00111011101100 100

......

00000000001110 100
          1011
00000000000101 100
           101 1
------------------
00000000000000 000 <--- remainder

The following Python code outlines a function which will return the initial CRC remainder for a chosen input and polynomial, with either 1 or 0 as the initial padding. This code works with string inputs rather than raw numbers:

def crc_remainder(input_bitstring, polynomial_bitstring, initial_filler):
    """Calculate the CRC remainder of a string of bits using a chosen polynomial.
    initial_filler should be '1' or '0'.
    """
    polynomial_bitstring = polynomial_bitstring.lstrip("0")
    len_input = len(input_bitstring)
    initial_padding = (len(polynomial_bitstring) - 1) * initial_filler
    input_padded_array = list(input_bitstring + initial_padding)
    while "1" in input_padded_array[:len_input]:
        cur_shift = input_padded_array.index("1")
        for i in range(len(polynomial_bitstring)):
            input_padded_array[cur_shift + i] \
            = str(int(polynomial_bitstring[i] != input_padded_array[cur_shift + i]))
    return "".join(input_padded_array)[len_input:]

def crc_check(input_bitstring, polynomial_bitstring, check_value):
    """Calculate the CRC check of a string of bits using a chosen polynomial."""
    polynomial_bitstring = polynomial_bitstring.lstrip("0")
    len_input = len(input_bitstring)
    initial_padding = check_value
    input_padded_array = list(input_bitstring + initial_padding)
    while "1" in input_padded_array[:len_input]:
        cur_shift = input_padded_array.index("1")
        for i in range(len(polynomial_bitstring)):
            input_padded_array[cur_shift + i] \
            = str(int(polynomial_bitstring[i] != input_padded_array[cur_shift + i]))
    return ("1" not in "".join(input_padded_array)[len_input:])

>>> crc_remainder('11010011101100', '1011', '0')
'100'
>>> crc_check('11010011101100', '1011', '100')
True

== Mathematics ==
Mathematical analysis of this division-like process reveals how to select a divisor that guarantees good error-detection properties. In this analysis, the digits of the bit strings are taken as the coefficients of a polynomial in some variable x—coefficients that are elements of the finite field GF(2) (the integers modulo 2, i.e. either a zero or a one), instead of more familiar numbers. The set of binary polynomials is a mathematical ring.

=== Designing polynomials ===
The selection of the generator polynomial is the most important part of implementing the CRC algorithm. The polynomial must be chosen to maximize the error-detecting capabilities while minimizing overall collision probabilities.

The most important attribute of the polynomial is its length (largest degree(exponent) +1 of any one term in the polynomial), because of its direct influence on the length of the computed check value.

The most commonly used polynomial lengths are 9 bits (CRC-8), 17 bits (CRC-16), 33 bits (CRC-32), and 65 bits (CRC-64). Note that because the remainder (and therefore the checksum) is one bit less, these correspond 1, 2, 4, and 8 byte checksums.

A CRC is called an n-bit CRC when its check value is n-bits. For a given n, multiple CRCs are possible, each with a different polynomial. Such a polynomial has highest degree n, and hence n + 1 terms (the polynomial has a length of n + 1). The remainder has length n. The CRC has a name of the form CRC-n-XXX.

The design of the CRC polynomial depends on the maximum total length of the block to be protected (data + CRC bits), the desired error protection features, and the type of resources for implementing the CRC, as well as the desired performance. A common misconception is that the "best" CRC polynomials are derived from either irreducible polynomials or irreducible polynomials times the factor 1 + x, which adds to the code the ability to detect all errors affecting an odd number of bits. In reality, all the factors described above should enter into the selection of the polynomial and may lead to a reducible polynomial. However, choosing a reducible polynomial will result in a certain proportion of missed errors, due to the quotient ring having zero divisors.

The advantage of choosing a primitive polynomial as the generator for a CRC code is that the resulting code has maximal total block length in the sense that all 1-bit errors within that block length have different remainders (also called syndromes) and therefore, since the remainder is a linear function of the block, the code can detect all 2-bit errors within that block length. If $r$ is the degree of the primitive generator polynomial, then the maximal total block length is $2 ^ {r} - 1$, and the associated code is able to detect any single-bit or double-bit errors. However, if we use the generator polynomial $g(x) = p(x)(1 + x)$, where $p$ is a primitive polynomial of degree $r - 1$, then the maximal total block length is $2^{r - 1} - 1$, and the code is able to detect single, double, triple and any odd number of errors.

A polynomial $g(x)$ that admits other factorizations may be chosen then so as to balance the maximal total blocklength with a desired error detection power. The BCH codes are a powerful class of such polynomials. They subsume the two examples above. Regardless of the reducibility properties of a generator polynomial of degree r, if it includes the "+1" term, the code will be able to detect error patterns that are confined to a window of r contiguous bits. These patterns are called "error bursts".

== Specification ==
The concept of the CRC as an error-detecting code gets complicated when an implementer or standards committee uses it to design a practical system. Here are some of the complications:

- Sometimes an implementation prefixes a fixed bit pattern to the bitstream to be checked. This is useful when clocking errors might insert 0-bits in front of a message, an alteration that would otherwise leave the check value unchanged.
- Usually, but not always, an implementation appends n 0-bits (n being the size of the CRC) to the bitstream to be checked before the polynomial division occurs. Such appending is explicitly demonstrated in the Computation of CRC article. This has the convenience that the remainder of the original bitstream with the check value appended is exactly zero, so the CRC can be checked simply by performing the polynomial division on the received bitstream and comparing the remainder with zero. Due to the associative and commutative properties of the exclusive-or operation, practical table driven implementations can obtain a result numerically equivalent to zero-appending without explicitly appending any zeroes, by using an equivalent, faster algorithm that combines the message bitstream with the stream being shifted out of the CRC register.
- Sometimes an implementation exclusive-ORs a fixed bit pattern into the remainder of the polynomial division.
- Bit order: Some schemes view the low-order bit of each byte as "first", which then during polynomial division means "leftmost", which is contrary to our customary understanding of "low-order". This convention makes sense when serial-port transmissions are CRC-checked in hardware, because some widespread serial-port transmission conventions transmit bytes least-significant bit first.
- Byte order: With multi-byte CRCs, there can be confusion over whether the byte transmitted first (or stored in the lowest-addressed byte of memory) is the least-significant byte (LSB) or the most-significant byte (MSB). For example, some 16-bit CRC schemes swap the bytes of the check value.
- Omission of the high-order bit of the divisor polynomial: Since the high-order bit is always 1, and since an n-bit CRC must be defined by an (n + 1)-bit divisor which overflows an n-bit register, some writers assume that it is unnecessary to mention the divisor's high-order bit.
- Omission of the low-order bit of the divisor polynomial: Since the low-order bit is always 1, authors such as Philip Koopman represent polynomials with their high-order bit intact, but without the low-order bit (the $x^0$ or 1 term). This convention encodes the polynomial complete with its degree in one integer.

These complications mean that there are three common ways to express a polynomial as an integer: the first two, which are mirror images in binary, are the constants found in code; the third is the number found in Koopman's papers. In each case, one term is omitted. So the polynomial $x^4 + x + 1$ may be transcribed as:

- 0x3 = 0b0011, representing $x^4 + (0x^3 + 0x^2 + 1x^1 + 1x^0)$ (MSB-first code)
- 0xC = 0b1100, representing $(1x^0 + 1x^1 + 0x^2 + 0x^3) + x^4$ (LSB-first code)
- 0x9 = 0b1001, representing $(1x^4 + 0x^3 + 0x^2 + 1x^1) + x^0$ (Koopman notation)

In the table below they are shown as:

Examples of CRC representations
Name	Normal	Reversed	Reversed reciprocal
CRC-4	0x3	0xC	0x9

== Obfuscation ==
CRCs in proprietary protocols might be obfuscated by using a non-trivial initial value and a final XOR, but these techniques do not introduce cryptographic strength into the algorithm and can be reverse engineered using straightforward methods.

== Standards and common use ==
Numerous varieties of cyclic redundancy checks have been incorporated into technical standards. By no means does one algorithm, or one of each degree, suit every purpose; Koopman and Chakravarty recommend selecting a polynomial according to the application requirements and the expected distribution of message lengths. The number of distinct CRCs in use has confused developers, a situation which authors have sought to address. There are three polynomials reported for CRC-12, twenty-two conflicting definitions of CRC-16, and seven of CRC-32.

The polynomials commonly applied are not the most efficient ones possible. Since 1993, Koopman, Castagnoli and others have surveyed the space of polynomials between 3 and 64 bits in size, finding examples that have much better performance (in terms of Hamming distance for a given message size) than the polynomials of earlier protocols, and publishing the best of these with the aim of improving the error detection capacity of future standards. In particular, iSCSI and SCTP have adopted one of the findings of this research, the CRC-32C (Castagnoli) polynomial.

The design of the 32-bit polynomial most commonly used by standards bodies, CRC-32-IEEE, was the result of a joint effort for the Rome Laboratory and the Air Force Electronic Systems Division by Joseph Hammond, James Brown and Shyan-Shiang Liu of the Georgia Institute of Technology and Kenneth Brayer of the Mitre Corporation. The earliest known appearances of the 32-bit polynomial were in their 1975 publications: Technical Report 2956 by Brayer for Mitre, published in January and released for public dissemination through DTIC in August, and Hammond, Brown and Liu's report for the Rome Laboratory, published in May. Both reports contained contributions from the other team. During December 1975, Brayer and Hammond presented their work in a paper at the IEEE National Telecommunications Conference: the IEEE CRC-32 polynomial is the generating polynomial of a Hamming code and was selected for its error detection performance. Even so, the Castagnoli CRC-32C polynomial used in iSCSI or SCTP matches its performance on messages from 58 bits to 131 kbits, and outperforms it in several size ranges including the two most common sizes of Internet packet. The ITU-T G.hn standard also uses CRC-32C to detect errors in the payload (although it uses CRC-16-CCITT for PHY headers).

CRC-32C computation is implemented in hardware as an operation (CRC32) of SSE4.2 instruction set, first introduced in Intel processors' Nehalem microarchitecture. ARM AArch64 architecture also provides hardware acceleration for both CRC-32 and CRC-32C operations.

== Polynomial representations ==
The table below lists only the polynomials of the various algorithms in use. Variations of a particular protocol can impose pre-inversion, post-inversion and reversed bit ordering as described above. For example, the CRC-32 used in Gzip and Bzip2 use the same polynomial, but Gzip employs reversed bit ordering, while Bzip2 does not. Note that even parity polynomials in GF(2) with degree greater than 1 are never primitive. Even parity polynomial marked as primitive in this table represent a primitive polynomial multiplied by (x + 1). The most significant bit of a polynomial is always 1, and is not shown in the hex representations.

Name	Uses	Polynomial representations				Parity	Primitive	Maximum bits of payload by Hamming distance														
Name	Uses	Normal	Reversed	Reciprocal	Reversed reciprocal	Parity	Primitive	≥ 16	15	14	13	12	11	10	9	8	7	6	5	4	3	2
CRC-1	most hardware; also known as parity bit	0x1	0x1	0x1	0x1	even																
CRC-1	most hardware; also known as parity bit	x + 1				even																
CRC-3-GSM	mobile networks	0x3	0x6	0x5	0x5	odd	yes	–	–	–	–	–	–	–	–	–	–	–	–	–	4	∞
CRC-3-GSM	mobile networks	x^{3} + x + 1				odd	yes	–	–	–	–	–	–	–	–	–	–	–	–	–	4	∞
CRC-4-ITU	ITU-T G.704, p. 12	0x3	0xC	0x9	0x9	odd																
CRC-4-ITU	ITU-T G.704, p. 12	x^{4} + x + 1				odd																
CRC-5-EPC	Gen 2 RFID	0x09	0x12	0x05	0x14	odd																
CRC-5-EPC	Gen 2 RFID	x^{5} + x^{3} + 1				odd																
CRC-5-ITU	ITU-T G.704, p. 9	0x15	0x15	0x0B	0x1A	even																
CRC-5-ITU	ITU-T G.704, p. 9	x^{5} + x^{4} + x^{2} + 1				even																
CRC-5-USB	USB token packets	0x05	0x14	0x09	0x12	odd																
CRC-5-USB	USB token packets	x^{5} + x^{2} + 1				odd																
CRC-6-CDMA2000-A	mobile networks	0x27	0x39	0x33	0x33	odd																
CRC-6-CDMA2000-B	mobile networks	0x07	0x38	0x31	0x23	even																
CRC-6-DARC	Data Radio Channel	0x19	0x26	0x0D	0x2C	even																
CRC-6-GSM	mobile networks	0x2F	0x3D	0x3B	0x37	even	yes	–	–	–	–	–	–	–	–	–	–	1	1	25	25	∞
CRC-6-GSM	mobile networks	x^{6} + x^{5} + x^{3} + x^{2} + x + 1				even	yes	–	–	–	–	–	–	–	–	–	–	1	1	25	25	∞
CRC-6-ITU	ITU-T G.704, p. 3	0x03	0x30	0x21	0x21	odd																
CRC-6-ITU	ITU-T G.704, p. 3	x^{6} + x + 1				odd																
CRC-7	telecom systems, ITU-T G.707, ITU-T G.832, MMC, SD	0x09	0x48	0x11	0x44	odd																
CRC-7	telecom systems, ITU-T G.707, ITU-T G.832, MMC, SD	x^{7} + x^{3} + 1				odd																
CRC-7-MVB	Train Communication Network, IEC 60870-5	0x65	0x53	0x27	0x72	odd																
CRC-8	DVB-S2	0xD5	0xAB	0x57	0xEA	even	no	–	–	–	–	–	–	–	–	–	–	2	2	85	85	∞
CRC-8	DVB-S2	x^{8} + x^{7} + x^{6} + x^{4} + x^{2} + 1				even	no	–	–	–	–	–	–	–	–	–	–	2	2	85	85	∞
CRC-8-AUTOSAR	automotive integration, OpenSafety	0x2F	0xF4	0xE9	0x97	even	yes	–	–	–	–	–	–	–	–	–	–	3	3	119	119	∞
CRC-8-AUTOSAR	automotive integration, OpenSafety	x^{8} + x^{5} + x^{3} + x^{2} + x + 1				even	yes	–	–	–	–	–	–	–	–	–	–	3	3	119	119	∞
CRC-8-Bluetooth	wireless connectivity	0xA7	0xE5	0xCB	0xD3	even																
CRC-8-Bluetooth	wireless connectivity	x^{8} + x^{7} + x^{5} + x^{2} + x + 1				even																
CRC-8-CCITT	ITU-T I.432.1 (02/99); ATM HEC, ISDN HEC and cell delineation, SMBus PEC	0x07	0xE0	0xC1	0x83	even																
CRC-8-CCITT	ITU-T I.432.1 (02/99); ATM HEC, ISDN HEC and cell delineation, SMBus PEC	x^{8} + x^{2} + x + 1				even																
CRC-8-Dallas/Maxim	1-Wire bus	0x31	0x8C	0x19	0x98	even																
CRC-8-Dallas/Maxim	1-Wire bus	x^{8} + x^{5} + x^{4} + 1				even																
CRC-8-DARC	Data Radio Channel	0x39	0x9C	0x39	0x9C	odd																
CRC-8-DARC	Data Radio Channel	x^{8} + x^{5} + x^{4} + x^{3} + 1				odd																
CRC-8-GSM-B	mobile networks	0x49	0x92	0x25	0xA4	even																
CRC-8-GSM-B	mobile networks	x^{8} + x^{6} + x^{3} + 1				even																
CRC-8-SAE J1850	AES3; OBD	0x1D	0xB8	0x71	0x8E	odd																
CRC-8-SAE J1850	AES3; OBD	x^{8} + x^{4} + x^{3} + x^{2} + 1				odd																
CRC-8-WCDMA	mobile networks	0x9B	0xD9	0xB3	0xCD	even																
CRC-8-WCDMA	mobile networks	x^{8} + x^{7} + x^{4} + x^{3} + x + 1				even																
CRC-10	ATM; ITU-T I.610	0x233	0x331	0x263	0x319	even																
CRC-10	ATM; ITU-T I.610	x^{10} + x^{9} + x^{5} + x^{4} + x + 1				even																
CRC-10-CDMA2000	mobile networks	0x3D9	0x26F	0x0DF	0x3EC	even																
CRC-10-GSM	mobile networks	0x175	0x2BA	0x175	0x2BA	odd																
CRC-11	FlexRay	0x385	0x50E	0x21D	0x5C2	even																
CRC-11	FlexRay	x^{11} + x^{9} + x^{8} + x^{7} + x^{2} + 1				even																
CRC-12	telecom systems	0x80F	0xF01	0xE03	0xC07	even																
CRC-12	telecom systems	x^{12} + x^{11} + x^{3} + x^{2} + x + 1				even																
CRC-12-CDMA2000	mobile networks	0xF13	0xC8F	0x91F	0xF89	even																
CRC-12-GSM	mobile networks	0xD31	0x8CB	0x197	0xE98	odd																
CRC-13-BBC	Time signal, Radio teleswitch	0x1CF5	0x15E7	0x0BCF	0x1E7A	even																
CRC-13-BBC	Time signal, Radio teleswitch	x^{13} + x^{12} + x^{11} + x^{10} + x^{7} + x^{6} + x^{5} + x^{4} + x^{2} + 1				even																
CRC-14-DARC	Data Radio Channel	0x0805	0x2804	0x1009	0x2402	even																
CRC-14-GSM	mobile networks	0x202D	0x2D01	0x1A03	0x3016	even																
CRC-15-CAN		0xC599	0x4CD1	0x19A3	0x62CC	even																
CRC-15-CAN		x^{15} + x^{14} + x^{10} + x^{8} + x^{7} + x^{4} + x^{3} + 1				even																
CRC-15-MPT1327		0x6815	0x540B	0x2817	0x740A	odd																
CRC-16-Chakravarty	Optimal for payloads ≤64 bits	0x2F15	0xA8F4	0x51E9	0x978A	odd																
CRC-16-ARINC	ACARS applications	0xA02B	0xD405	0xA80B	0xD015	odd																
CRC-16-CCITT	''x''.25, V.41, HDLC FCS, XMODEM, Bluetooth, PACTOR, SD, DigRF, many others; known as CRC-CCITT	0x1021	0x8408	0x811	0x8810	even																
CRC-16-CCITT	''x''.25, V.41, HDLC FCS, XMODEM, Bluetooth, PACTOR, SD, DigRF, many others; known as CRC-CCITT	x^{16} + x^{12} + x^{5} + 1				even																
CRC-16-CDMA2000	mobile networks	0xC867	0xE613	0xCC27	0xE433	odd																
CRC-16-DECT	cordless telephones	0x0589	0x91A0	0x2341	0x82C4	even																
CRC-16-DECT	cordless telephones	x^{16} + x^{10} + x^{8} + x^{7} + x^{3} + 1				even																
CRC-16-T10-DIF	SCSI DIF, NVMe (16b Guard Protection information)	0x8BB7	0xEDD1	0xDBA3	0xC5DB	odd																
CRC-16-T10-DIF	SCSI DIF, NVMe (16b Guard Protection information)	x^{16} + x^{15} + x^{11} + x^{9} + x^{8} + x^{7} + x^{5} + x^{4} + x^{2} + x + 1				odd																
CRC-16-DNP	DNP, IEC 870, M-Bus	0x3D65	0xA6BC	0x4D79	0x9EB2	even																
CRC-16-DNP	DNP, IEC 870, M-Bus	x^{16} + x^{13} + x^{12} + x^{11} + x^{10} + x^{8} + x^{6} + x^{5} + x^{2} + 1				even																
CRC-16-IBM	Bisync, Modbus, USB, ANSI X3.28, SIA DC-07, many others; also known as CRC-16 and CRC-16-ANSI	0x8005	0xA001	0x4003	0xC002	even																
CRC-16-IBM	Bisync, Modbus, USB, ANSI X3.28, SIA DC-07, many others; also known as CRC-16 and CRC-16-ANSI	x^{16} + x^{15} + x^{2} + 1				even																
CRC-16-OpenSafety-A	safety fieldbus	0x5935	0xAC9A	0x5935	0xAC9A	odd																
CRC-16-OpenSafety-B	safety fieldbus	0x755B	0xDAAE	0xB55D	0xBAAD	odd																
CRC-16-Profibus	fieldbus networks	0x1DCF	0xF3B8	0xE771	0x8EE7	odd																
Fletcher-16	Used in Adler-32 A & B Checksums	Often confused to be a CRC, but actually a checksum; see Fletcher's checksum																				
CRC-17-CAN	CAN FD	0x1685B	0x1B42D	0x1685B	0x1B42D	even																
CRC-21-CAN	CAN FD	0x102899	0x132281	0x064503	0x18144C	even																
CRC-24	FlexRay	0x5D6DCB	0xD3B6BA	0xA76D75	0xAEB6E5	even																
CRC-24	FlexRay	x^{24} + x^{22} + x^{20} + x^{19} + x^{18} + x^{16} + x^{14} + x^{13} + x^{11} + x^{10} + x^{8} + x^{7} + x^{6} + x^{3} + x + 1				even																
CRC-24-Radix-64	OpenPGP, RTCM104v3	0x864CFB	0xDF3261	0xBE64C3	0xC3267D	even																
CRC-24-Radix-64	OpenPGP, RTCM104v3	x^{24} + x^{23} + x^{18} + x^{17} + x^{14} + x^{11} + x^{10} + x^{7} + x^{6} + x^{5} + x^{4} + x^{3} + x + 1				even																
CRC-24-WCDMA	Used in OS-9 RTOS. Residue = 0x800FE3.	0x800063	0xC60001	0x8C0003	0xC00031	even	yes	–	–	–	–	–	–	–	–	–	–	4	4	8388583	8388583	∞
CRC-24-WCDMA	Used in OS-9 RTOS. Residue = 0x800FE3.	x^{24} + x^{23} + x^{6} + x^{5} + x + 1				even	yes	–	–	–	–	–	–	–	–	–	–	4	4	8388583	8388583	∞
CRC-30	CDMA	0x2030B9C7	0x38E74301	0x31CE8603	0x30185CE3	even																
CRC-30	CDMA	x^{30} + x^{29} + x^{21} + x^{20} + x^{15} + x^{13} + x^{12} + x^{11} + x^{8} + x^{7} + x^{6} + x^{2} + x + 1				even																
CRC-32	ISO 3309 (HDLC), ANSI X3.66 (ADCCP), FIPS PUB 71, FED-STD-1003, ITU-T V.42, ISO/IEC/IEEE 802-3 (Ethernet), ISO/IEC/IEEE 802-11 (Wi-Fi), SATA, MPEG-2, PKZIP, Gzip, Bzip2, PCI Express, HDMI, POSIX cksum, PNG, ZMODEM, many others	0x04C11DB7	0xEDB88320	0xDB710641	0x82608EDB	odd	yes	–	10	–	–	12	21	34	57	91	171	268	2974	91607	4294967263	∞
CRC-32	ISO 3309 (HDLC), ANSI X3.66 (ADCCP), FIPS PUB 71, FED-STD-1003, ITU-T V.42, ISO/IEC/IEEE 802-3 (Ethernet), ISO/IEC/IEEE 802-11 (Wi-Fi), SATA, MPEG-2, PKZIP, Gzip, Bzip2, PCI Express, HDMI, POSIX cksum, PNG, ZMODEM, many others	x^{32} + x^{26} + x^{23} + x^{22} + x^{16} + x^{12} + x^{11} + x^{10} + x^{8} + x^{7} + x^{5} + x^{4} + x^{2} + x + 1				odd	yes	–	10	–	–	12	21	34	57	91	171	268	2974	91607	4294967263	∞
CRC-32C (Castagnoli)	iSCSI, NVMe (32b Guard Protection information), SCTP, G.hn payload, SSE4.2, Btrfs, ext4, ReFS, VHDX, Ceph	0x1EDC6F41	0x82F63B78	0x05EC76F1	0x8F6E37A0	even	yes	6	–	8	–	20	–	47	–	177	–	5243	–	2147483615	–	∞
CRC-32C (Castagnoli)	iSCSI, NVMe (32b Guard Protection information), SCTP, G.hn payload, SSE4.2, Btrfs, ext4, ReFS, VHDX, Ceph	x^{32} + x^{28} + x^{27} + x^{26} + x^{25} + x^{23} + x^{22} + x^{20} + x^{19} + x^{18} + x^{14} + x^{13} + x^{11} + x^{10} + x^{9} + x^{8} + x^{6} + 1				even	yes	6	–	8	–	20	–	47	–	177	–	5243	–	2147483615	–	∞
CRC-32K (Koopman {1,3,28})	Excellent at Ethernet frame length, poor performance with long files	0x741B8CD7	0xEB31D82E	0xD663B05D	0xBA0DC66B	even	no	2	–	4	–	16	–	18	–	152	–	16360	–	114663	–	∞
CRC-32K (Koopman {1,3,28})	Excellent at Ethernet frame length, poor performance with long files	x^{32} + x^{30} + x^{29} + x^{28} + x^{26} + x^{20} + x^{19} + x^{17} + x^{16} + x^{15} + x^{11} + x^{10} + x^{7} + x^{6} + x^{4} + x^{2} + x + 1				even	no	2	–	4	–	16	–	18	–	152	–	16360	–	114663	–	∞
CRC-32K_{2} (Koopman {1,1,30})	Excellent at Ethernet frame length, poor performance with long files	0x32583499	0x992C1A4C	0x32583499	0x992C1A4C	even	no	–	–	3	–	16	–	26	–	134	–	32738	–	65506	–	∞
CRC-32Q	aviation; AIXM	0x814141AB	0xD5828281	0xAB050503	0xC0A0A0D5	even																
CRC-32Q	aviation; AIXM	x^{32} + x^{31} + x^{24} + x^{22} + x^{16} + x^{14} + x^{8} + x^{7} + x^{5} + x^{3} + x + 1				even																
Adler-32		Often confused to be a CRC, but actually a checksum; see Adler-32																				
CRC-40-GSM	GSM control channel	0x0004820009	0x9000412000	0x2000824001	0x8002410004	even																
CRC-40-GSM	GSM control channel	x^{40} + x^{26} + x^{23} + x^{17} + x^{3} + 1 = (x^{23} + 1) (x^{17} + x^{3} + 1)				even																
CRC-64-ECMA	ECMA-182 p. 51, XZ Utils	0x42F0E1EBA9EA3693	0xC96C5795D7870F42	0x92D8AF2BAF0E1E85	0xA17870F5D4F51B49	even																
CRC-64-ECMA	ECMA-182 p. 51, XZ Utils	x^{64} + x^{62} + x^{57} + x^{55} + x^{54} + x^{53} + x^{52} + x^{47} + x^{46} + x^{45} + x^{40} + x^{39} + x^{38} + x^{37} + x^{35} + x^{33} + x^{32} + x^{31} + x^{29} + x^{27} + x^{24} + x^{23} + x^{22} + x^{21} + x^{19} + x^{17} + x^{13} + x^{12} + x^{10} + x^{9} + x^{7} + x^{4} + x + 1				even																
CRC-64-ISO	ISO 3309 (HDLC), Swiss-Prot/TrEMBL; considered weak for hashing	0x000000000000001B	0xD800000000000000	0xB000000000000001	0x800000000000000D	odd																
CRC-64-ISO	ISO 3309 (HDLC), Swiss-Prot/TrEMBL; considered weak for hashing	x^{64} + x^{4} + x^{3} + x + 1				odd																
CRC-64-Rocksoft	NVMe (64b Guard Protection information)	0xAD93D23594C93659	0x9A6C9329AC4BC9B5	0x34D926535897936B	0xD6C9E91ACA649B2C	odd																
CRC-64-Rocksoft	NVMe (64b Guard Protection information)	x^{64} + x^{63} + x^{61} + x^{59} + x^{58} + x^{56} + x^{55} + x^{52} + x^{49} + x^{48} + x^{47} + x^{46} + x^{44} + x^{41} + x^{37} + x^{36} + x^{34} + x^{32} + x^{31} + x^{28} + x^{26} + x^{23} + x^{22} + x^{19} + x^{16} + x^{13} + x^{12} + x^{10} + x^{9} + x^{6} + x^{4} + x^{3} + 1				odd																

=== Implementations ===
- Implementation of CRC32 in GNU Radio up to 3.6.1 (ca. 2012)
- C class code for CRC checksum calculation with many different CRCs to choose from
- CRC-32 - Rosetta Code

=== CRC catalogues ===
- Catalogue of parametrised CRC algorithms
- CRC Polynomial Zoo

== See also ==
- Checksum
- Computation of cyclic redundancy checks
- Information security
- List of checksum algorithms
- List of hash functions
- LRC
- Mathematics of cyclic redundancy checks
- Simple file verification
