= Vehicle Information and Communication System =

Traffic information technology used in Japan

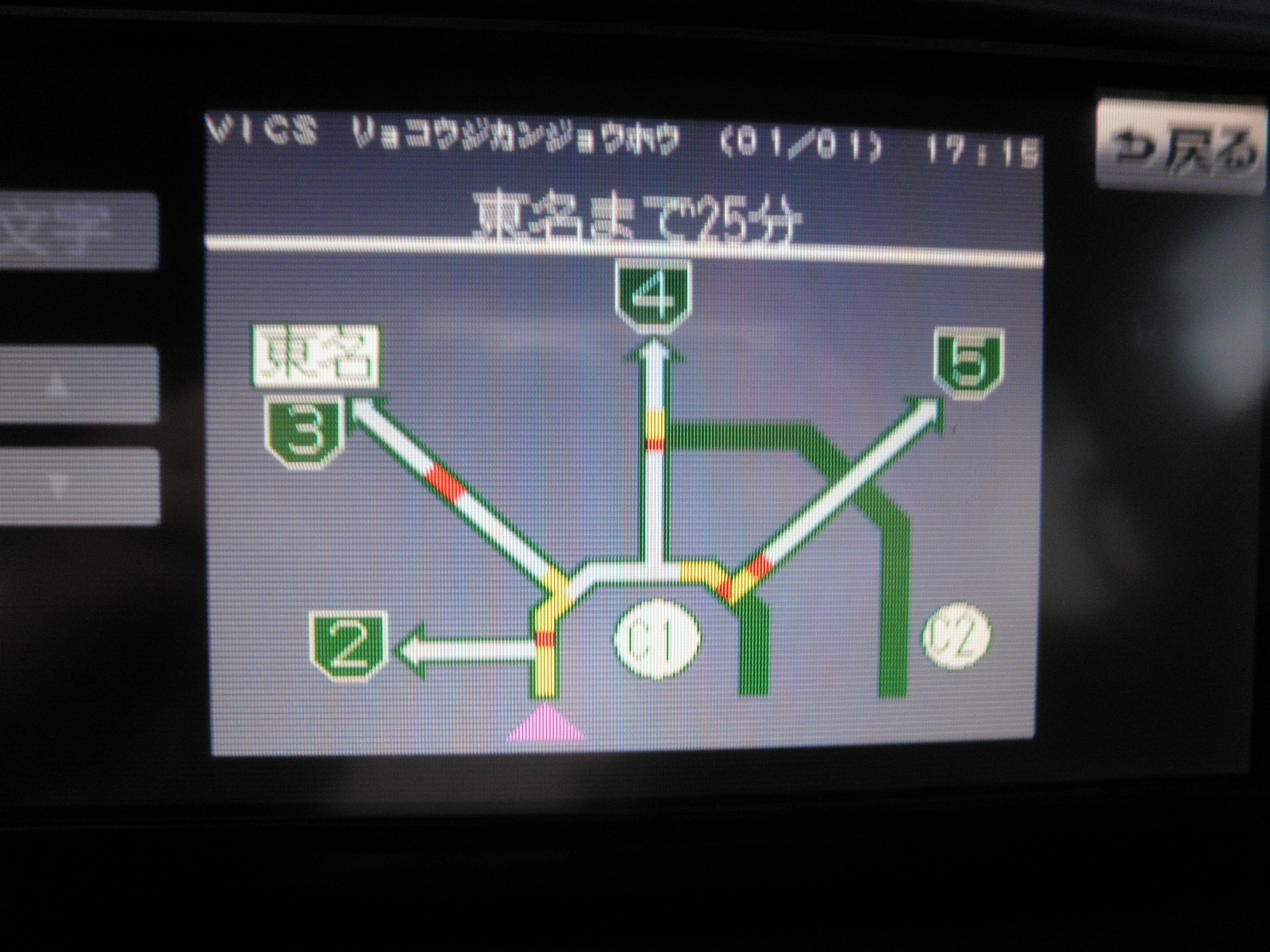
A VICS map showing the current condition of various expressways

Vehicle Information and Communication System (VICS) is a technology used in Japan for delivering traffic and travel information to road vehicle drivers. It provides simple maps showing information about traffic jams, travel time, and road work - usually relevant to your location and usually incorporating infrared beacons.

It can be compared with the European TMC technology.

VICS is transmitted using:

- FM multiplex broadcasting (uses DARC). With this method, you have to manually select road conditions on-screen.
- Infrared beacons over Japan's highways and urban roads. With this method, road conditions automatically pop up.
- Microwaves in the ISM band.

It is an application of ITS.

The VICS information can be displayed on the car navigation unit at 3 levels:

1. Level-1: Simple text data
2. Level-2: In form of simple diagrams
3. Level-3: Data superimposed on the map displayed on navigation unit (e.g., traffic congestion data)

Information transmitted generally includes traffic congestion data, data on availability of service areas (SA) and parking areas (PA), information on road works and traffic collisions.

Some advanced navigation units might utilize this data for route calculation (e.g., choosing a route to avoid congestion) or the driver might use his/her own discretion while using this information.

== See also ==
- G-Book
- Internavi
- CarWings
