= MyMail =

Mobile app for managing multiple email accounts

myMail App
- Developer: My.com
- Operating system: iOS, Android
- Website: mymail.my.com

myMail is a mobile app for managing multiple email accounts created by My.com, a subsidiary of Mail.Ru Group. Using POP/IMAP, SMTP and Microsoft Exchange ActiveSync protocols, myMail provides real-time, customizable notifications, data compression for sending/receiving email traffic and search functionality.

myMail was released in the U.S. for Android and iOS (iPhone and iPad) mobile platforms in November 2013. It is now available worldwide through the iOS App Store and Google Play.

== Primary functionality ==
- Managing multiple email accounts from one mobile app
- Customizable push notifications: Turn off/on by time of day, by email account, by folder or by sender. Hide sender name or subject
- Avatars and icons: Avatars and icons make email a personal experience by visually indicating the sender of email
- Swipe gestures: touch screen gestures for moving between email accounts and for managing individual or multiple emails. Gestures reveal icons for marking as read/unread, delete, move to folder or marking as spam
- Support for major email account services such as Gmail, Yahoo!, Outlook, AOL and most POP3 or IMAP email services
- Data compression which speeds up email delivery decreasing data usage
- Ability to preview/forward multiple attachments without downloading to the device
- Ability to attach multiple images to an email in one step
- Smart search function searches through all email accounts and suggests word phrases based on previous email content
- Address book integration

== Supported email services ==
myMail automatically defines the settings for most email providers (Google Gmail, Yahoo! Mail, Outlook.com (including Hotmail and Office 365), AOL Email, Xfinity.com, QQ.COM Mail, 163.COM Mail, Mail.Ru – Mail, Yandex Mail, 126.COM, Orange Mail, WP.PL – Poczta, Web.de Freemail and many other POP3/IMAP service). Additionally, oAuth is supported for those email services who use the standard to verify third-party credentials.

== Problems ==
- myMail transfers your username and password of your mail account to the server of the service provider. This server logs into your mail account and downloads your mail. The mobile device gets its push notifications from this Russian server. This may pose an unacceptable security risk to individuals or organizations.
- Local mailserver, which are not reachable from the internet, can't be used by the app even if the mobile device is in the same LAN as the mailserver
- @My.com email addresses are no longer working in some countries due to regional blocking by Russia.
