= DoubleDOS =

- Developer(s): Softlogic Solutions
- Initial release: 1984; 41 years ago
- Operating system: IBM PC DOS
- Platform: IBM PC compatible

DoubleDOS was a computer program that extended the IBM PC DOS operating system with limited multitasking capabilities. The program partitioned the computer's memory in two, running an instance of DOS in both, and allowed users to switch between the two.

DoubleDOS was announced in 1984 by a firm called Softlogic Solutions, and sold for USD299. In a 1987 ad, the company offered the software for USD49.99, pitting it against competitors TopView and Windows. A review in 1986's Business Software found programs running under DoubleDOS ran considerably slower, "even when nothing is running in the other partition".

== See also ==
- DESQview
- PC-MOS/386
