= X00 =

X00 was a popular DOS-based FOSSIL driver which was commonly used in the mid-1980s to the late 1990s and is even still used today. FOSSIL drivers were mainly used to run BBS software under MS-DOS. X00 can also be run under Windows, or even Linux and DOSEMU environments, to allow FOSSIL-aware MS-DOS based applications to function.

== History ==
X00 was developed by Raymond L. Gwinn from 1989 until 1993. The final release version was version 1.50, with a later beta version 1.53 which added support for baud rates above 38400. X00 is free for non-commercial usage. X00 included many enhancements to the FTSC FOSSIL revision 5 specifications, which were later used in other FOSSIL drivers such as ADF and NetFoss.

Gwinn moved on to develop a replacement serial port driver for OS/2 called SIO. SIO contained a virtualized FOSSIL (VX00) that could be loaded if applications needed FOSSIL support.
