= Data Radio Channel =

Data Radio Channel (DARC) is a high-rate (16 kbit/s) standard for encoding data in a subcarrier over FM radio broadcasts. It uses a frequency of 76 kHz, the fourth harmonic of the FM radio pilot tone.

DARC was approved as the All-European standard ETS 300 751 in 1997.

== Applications ==
DARC is well-suited to distributing traffic information because of its higher speed. In Japan, the VICS (Vehicle Information and Communication System) service has operated since 1996 in the Tokyo, Nagoya and Osaka metropolitan areas. In France, DARC has been tested for traffic message channel services.

In the United States, it was used to deliver stock market quotations by Digital DJ beginning in 1998.

In Munich, DARC is used to transmit public transport data to battery-powered signs in bus and tram stations.

== Similar technologies ==
Other data broadcasting technologies include RDS and Microsoft's DirectBand.
