= List of BBS software =

List of non-internet BBS programs

This is a list of notable bulletin board system (BBS) software packages.

== Multi-platform ==
- Citadel – originally written for the CP/M operating system, had many forks for different systems under different names.
- CONFER – CONFER II on the MTS, CONFER U on Unix and CONFER V on VAX/VMS, written by Robert Parnes starting in 1975.
- Mystic BBS – written by James Coyle with versions for Windows/Linux/ARM Linux/OSX. Past versions: MS-DOS and OS/2.
- Synchronet – Windows/Linux/BSD, past versions: MS-DOS and OS/2.
- WWIV – WWIV v5.x is supported on both Windows 7+ 32bit as well as Linux 32bit and 64bit. Written by Wayne Bell, included WWIVNet. Past versions: MS-DOS and OS/2.

== Altos 68000 ==
- PicoSpan

== Amiga ==
- Ami-Express – aka "/X", very popular in the crackers/warez software scene.
- C-Net – aka "Cnet"

== Apple II ==
- Diversi-Dial (DDial) – Chat-room atmosphere supporting up to 7 incoming lines allowing links to other DDial boards.
- GBBS – Applesoft and assembler-based BBS program by Greg Schaeffer.
- GBBS Pro – based on the ACOS or MACOS (modified ACOS) language.
- Net-Works II – by Nick Naimo.
- SBBS – Sonic BBS by Patrick Sonnek.

== Atari 8-bit computers ==
- Atari Message Information System – and derivatives

== Commodore 64 ==
- Blue Board – by Martin Sikes.
- C*Base – by Gunther Birznieks, Jerome P. Yoner, and David Weinehall.
- C-Net DS2 – by Jim Selleck.
- McBBS – by Derek E. McDonald.

== CP/M ==
- CBBS – The first ever BBS software, written by Ward Christensen.
- Citadel
- RBBS
- TBBS

== Macintosh ==
- Citadel – including Macadel, MacCitadel.
- FirstClass (SoftArc)
- Hermes
- Second Sight
- TeleFinder

== Microsoft Windows ==
- Excalibur BBS
- Maximus
- Mystic BBS

== MS-DOS and compatible ==
- Citadel – including DragCit, Cit86, TurboCit, Citadel+
- FBB (F6FBB) – packet radio BBS system, still in use.
- GBBS (Graphics BBS) – used in the Melbourne area.
- GT-Power
- L.S.D. BBS – written by The Slavelord of The Humble Guys (THG).
- The Major BBS
- Maximus
- McBBS – by Derek E. McDonald.
- Opus-CBCS – first written by Wynn Wagner III.
- PCBoard
- PegaSys
- ProBoard BBS – written by Philippe Leybaert (Belgium)
- QuickBBS – written by Adam Hudson, with assistance by Phil Becker.
- RBBS-PC
- RemoteAccess – written by Andrew Milner.
- Renegade – written by Cott Lang until 1997. Currently maintained by T.J. McMillen since 2003.
- RoboBOARD/FX – written by Seth Hamilton.
- Searchlight BBS (SLBBS)
- Spitfire
- SuperBBS – by Aki Antman and Risto Virkkala.
- TBBS
- TCL
- Telegard
- TAG
- Virtual Advanced – also known as VBBS.
- Waffle – written by Tom Dell, and supported UUCP (and Fidonet through extensions).
- Wildcat! – originally by Mustang Software.

== OS/2 ==
- Maximus
- PCBoard
- Virtual Advanced – also known as VBBS.

== TRS-80 ==
- Forum 80
- TBBS - by Phil Becker, for the Model III/4

== Unix and compatible ==
- Citadel – including Citadel/UX, Dave's Own Citadel.
- Firebird BBS – Linux-based.
- Major BBS
- Maple BBS
- Maximus
- PCBoard v16 – formerly by CDC, now by MP Solutions, LLC.
- PicoSpan
- Waffle (BBS software)
