= GT-Power =

GT-Power (BBS)
- Original author: Paul Meiners
- Developers: P & M Software
- Release: 1980s
- Platform: MS-DOS
- Type: bulletin board system (BBS), dial-up telecommunications/terminal application

GT Power is a bulletin board system (BBS) and dial-up telecommunications/terminal application for MS-DOS. It was first introduced in the 1980s by P & M Software, founded by Paul Meiners. GT Power can be used both to host a BBS as well as to connect to other BBS systems via its full-featured dial-up "terminal mode". GT Power was a shareware package that required a registration fee in order to access its proprietary network mail transport/handling software and, by default, the GT Power Network. The software is distributed in two "flavors": a terminal-only version, nicknamed GTO, and the full-featured host and terminal version.

The source code for GT Power was sold twice during the late 1990s, again in 2008 and is currently the property of Tom Watt.

Although GT Power was written to run under DOS, it is also quite capable under the Microsoft Windows (versions with DOS support) and OS/2 (including eComStation and ArcaOS) operating systems. When it is running under OS/2, GT Power can also be used as a telnet BBS host and terminal program via use of an OS/2 shareware virtual modem application called VMODEM.

== History ==
GT Power was originally a telecommunications/terminal application, known as GT Powercomm, which could be used to dial-up other BBS systems. As time passed, a host mode was written into the application which allowed the user to accept incoming data calls. Before the release of version 13.00 (released Autumn, 1987), the host mode portion of the application had been expanded to become a full-blown BBS host application, complete with message and file areas, file uploading and downloading, the capability to host BBS door programs, and a sysop-to-user chat mode.

The name was shortened to GT Power sometime before the release of version 14.03 in the autumn of 1988.

With version 13.00, P & M software began offering a proprietary Netmail Suite; a set of applications which allow GT Power BBS systems to connect and exchange routed person-to-person netmail. By the time version 14.03 was released, the suite was expanded to include the ability to also exchange echomail between systems, similar to FidoNet echomail. Upon registering GT Power, the user obtained a special password which enabled the Netmail Suite applications, and a key code that disabled any registration reminder delays in GT Power.

The Netmail Suite consisted of a mail transfer program and two mail handling programs. The mail transfer program, called MDRIVer, was used to dial other GT Power systems, to authenticate their identity, and to transfer mail between the two systems. The mail handling programs were used to "bag" mail and prepare it for transfer (MBAGger), and to unpack received mail and distribute it to the proper message areas (MDIST).

P & M Software released its last version of GT Power, version 19.00, in September, 1994. In mid-February, 1998, it was announced that P&M Software had sold the GT Power source code to New Millennium Software. New Millennium renamed the project GT 2000 but, by the end of April, it was announced that New Millennium would not develop the product. The source was sold again to Dennis Berry, a GT Power sysop.

In late 1999, Berry released a Y2K bug fix for the Netmail Suite. A third party Y2K fix for the Suite, as well as other third party companion software, was also released. The GT Power application itself appeared to have no Y2K issues, with 19.00 being the latest release.

The source code and rights were sold to Tom Watt in June 2008 and he has resumed development of GT-Power. For the first time since Paul stopped development, the source code has been made to compile the EXEs as they were last released in 1994.

== Features ==
The following list of features applies to the most-recent version of GT Power (19.00).

Features of both the terminal and host modes:

- ANSI and VT-52 terminal emulation;
- ANSI color graphics and music support that does not require ANSI.SYS (introduced version 12.20);
- RIP graphics support (ver. 19.00);
- support for multiple dialing directories, with up to 999 entries each (terminal mode);
- circular dialing queue, and redial-on-busy (terminal mode);
- a script language, for creating dialing and other scripts;
- user-assignable function key/macro support;
- built-in file transfer protocols, including Xmodem, WXmodem, Ymodem, SEAlink, Telink, & MegaLink;
- support for up to 18 additional "external" file-transfer protocols, such as Zmodem and HS/Link;
- support for non-standard COM ports (3-8), & non-standard IRQs (up to IRQ 15);
- support for 300-33.6k baud modems, 16550 UART, and locked port speeds up to 115200;
- DESQview, DoubleDos, Windows, and OS/2 aware;
- caller-id support;
- optional capture mode and scroll-back buffering;
- the ability to use PC-Pursuit to make outgoing calls, both in terminal mode and with MDRIVer.

In addition, the BBS host mode has the following features:

- Built-in QWK mail and QWK networking support (non-proprietary);
- semi-configurable menus and prompts;
- support for multiple message areas (ver. 12.10) and file areas (prior to ver. 12.00);
- proprietary Netmail Suite with netmail and echomail support (ver. 13.00);
- full-screen ANSI message editing;
- CD-ROM file area support;
- FILE.DIZ support for file uploads;
- multinode capable, on a network or under multitasking software, such as DESQview or OS/2;
- multinode CB chat (users can chat between nodes);
- time banking;
- threaded reading of messages;
- Carbon-Copy list support in messages;
- Return Receipt message support in netmail;
- support for up to 999 external BBS door programs (ver. 19.00; doors introduced ver. 12.20);
- mailboxes for private user-to-user mail exchange (ver. 19.00);
- variable substitution and @ macros for bulletin and menu files;
- user-configurable multiple language support;
- user-configurable questionnaire/voting booth functions (ver. 12.20);
- user-configurable automatic virus scan of uploaded files;
- the ability to set up "freebie" file downloads and file areas;
- user-configurable access levels and controls (introduced before ver. 12.00);
- a task scheduler, for scheduling daily maintenance, etc. (ver. 13.00);
- two distinct varieties of RINGBACK service, one of which allows sysops to run a BBS on a voice line (ver. 13.00);
- a user maintenance program, called SYSOP (ver. 15.00);
- the ability to accept a "hand-off" from front-end programs, such as Binkleyterm.

Other features can be added via the use of third-party software and add-ons.

=== Telnet use ===
GT Power also has the undocumented feature of telnet compatibility, in both BBS host and terminal mode, when used with a virtual modem software package called VMODEM under the OS/2, eComStation and ArcaOS operating systems.

== Third party software ==
Many third party software packages were developed to support the GT Power BBS. Early distributions of GT Power included a third party application called GTCTL, written by James Davis, followed later by Sysop Tools, written by Chris Smith. Both were later replaced by the P & M SYSOP program. Unlike SYSOP, Sysop Tools had an ANSI-style DOS graphic user interface. All three were used mostly for user and control file maintenance. Other third-party software includes:

- external message readers, allowing the sysop to read & enter messages locally without logging into the BBS;
- a QWK mail application, which could be added as a door or external menu option, that pre-dates and is more configurable than the built-in version (it could also be used for QWK networking);
- Command line/batch file applications which allow GT Power systems to participate in Fidonet, RIME, and QWK networking;
- applications which create popular door drop file formats, such as DOORINF and DOOR.SYS, allowing GT Power systems access to more BBS door software;
- an application that allowed full-screen message editing, before it was included in GT Power;
- an interface which allowed earlier GT Power systems to run the PCBoard door Prodoor;
- applications which allow GT Power systems to add Usenet newsgroups and Internet e-mail capability;
- an application which allowed GT Power systems to exchange mail via Internet e-mail file attachments;
- applications which allowed GT Power users to change their passwords online (since added to GT Power), as well as to force users to change passwords after a specified time;
- various usage reporting applications;
- various other applications.

A third-party mail transfer program, called Mailrun, was developed which allows GT Power Network systems to transfer mail using the bi-directional HS/Link protocol. In theory, the use of the bi-directional protocol (which sent and received files at the same time) will shorten the length of dial-up netmail calls, saving the sysop some long-distance phone charges. This program can be used as a replacement for the proprietary MDRIVer program, but requires the use of the proprietary MBAGger & MDIST programs. With proper setup, Mailrun can co-exist with MDRIVer, allowing systems to use both programs to transfer mail. Mailrun is freeware, but does require a free key code from the developer in order to connect with other systems. Mailrun is stated to be compatible with GT Power versions 17.00 through 19.00, but can work with earlier versions.

In addition, in 1989, a third-party mail handling application, called JDMAL, was released. It was developed by James Davis, who had previously worked with Meiners in developing the proprietary suite. It could be used as a replacement for the proprietary MBAGger & MDIST programs, but did not replace the MDRIVer program. The last few releases of JDMAL, versions 8.1 and later, were freeware, and were compatible with GT Power versions 13.00 through 14.03.

== The GT Power Network ==
As the GT Power software application evolved to include a BBS host mode, P & M Software developed a Netmail Suite package which allowed registered users of GT Power to participate in the GT Power Network. With this Netmail Suite, GT Power BBS systems could exchange netmail and echomail with each other.

As use of GT Power increased, the network grew. At various times during the late 1980s/early 1990s, the Network included hundreds of nodes in the continental United States, Canada, Hawaii, China, Australia, New Zealand, Bermuda, the Caribbean and much of Europe. The proprietary nature of the networking software, combined with the lack of easy-to-configure built-in support for other networking methods, has held the number of nodes below those found on Fidonet.

Like Fidonet, the GT Power Network offered both netmail and echomail. Where netmail is usually system-to-system, person-to-person mail, echomail was intended to be read & possibly replied to by users on all GT Power Network BBS systems. Each echo had a different topic, such as politics, computer technical support, and ANSI art. The GT Power Network's application of echomail was different from Fidonet in that echomail messages traveled back to the moderator's (or "sponsor's") BBS before being distributed to the rest of the network. This had the advantage of allowing the moderator to review every message before it was allowed to echo to the rest of the network, creating the potential for a truly moderated echo conference. On the downside, a slight disruption in network routing could cause active echos to appear quite stale.

Around the beginning of 1990, there was a rift in the GT Power Network, resulting in the formation of a second network based on GT Power. The Alliance of Free Sysops Network, or AFSN, was formed, with some GT Power sysops finding ways to participate in both networks. By 1992, as AFSN sysops began migrating to other BBS software, the network had expanded to include both GT Power and QWK networking nodes, some of which had never run GT Power software.

The AFSN either folded, or merged with another QWK network, sometime in the late 1990s.

Like many other BBS networks, as use of the Internet increased, the GT Power network declined. Today, the GT Power Network continues on, albeit on a much smaller scale than before. Many nodes on the network today participate in echomail via QWK networking as the former GT Power sysops have migrated to Windows and Linux native BBS applications. These other applications do not support the GT Power proprietary mail programs.

== GT Power today ==
Most GT Power sysops have either retired their BBS systems or have migrated to other applications. Nearly all of the remaining GT Power Network BBS systems have replaced their dial-up networking with forms of mail transfer that take advantage of the Internet, by using either e-mail file attachments or some form of automated ftp.

At least one dial-up GT Power BBS still exists in North America. The Capitol City Online BBS, which has been online for over 20 years, currently offers both dial-up and telnet access to its callers.

== See also ==
- List of BBS software
- List of bulletin board systems
- BBS: The Documentary
- ANSI art
- Terminal software
- QWK (file format)
