= Mystic BBS =

- Original author: James Coyle
- Stable release: 1.12 A48 / January 15, 2023
- Written in: FreePascal
- Operating system: MS-DOS, Windows, OS/2, OS X, Linux
- Platform: IA_32, x86-64, ARM, AARCH64
- Type: BBS
- License: Proprietary freeware
- Website: www.mysticbbs.com

Mystic BBS is a bulletin board system software program that began in 1995 and was first released to the public in December 1997 for MS-DOS. It has been ported to Microsoft Windows, OS/2, OS X, and Linux (Intel and ARM based systems such as the Raspberry Pi). Mystic was designed to be a spiritual successor to the Renegade (BBS) and Telegard bulletin board systems.

Some of the more notable capabilities of Mystic BBS include:

- Integrated Telnet, SSH, rlogin, FTP, binkp, HTTP, NNTP, POP3, SMTP servers with IPv4 + IPv6 support
- Full 5D compliant FidoNet BSO mailer and tosser, including binkp & FTP mailers
- Built in AreaFix and FileFix functionality and full fileecho support
- Integrated QWK and QWKE networking via FTP
- Integrated text and ANSI editors, message editing with on-the-fly spell checking and word suggestions
- Proprietary scripting language called Mystic Programming Language (MPL)
- Embedded Python 2.x and 3.x programming languages
- DOS code page 437 and UTF8 character translations, terminal sizes up to 160x60
- Dynamic menus including menu editor, and fully customizable prompts
- Multiple user-selectable themes
- DOOR32 support in addition to various DOS-type door formats
- A fully featured ACS (access control system) and MCI display codes
- Modern security features such as TLS v1.2+, 512-bit PBKDF2 password storage, and AES-256 encrypted Netmail
- Highly integrated with ANSI graphics including full screen editor, lightbar menus, lightbar file listings and message reading
- Advanced, feature-rich JAM message base system with QWK/QWKE offline mail
- Multiple platform distributions available including Windows, OS X, Linux and ARM Linux (Raspberry Pi, ODROID, etc.)

A more complete list of capabilities can be found at http://www.mysticbbs.com/features.html

Attracted to the flexibility and potential that the scripting language provides, a number groups, such as ACiDic BBS modding, Cyberia, Demonic, DoRE, Vanguard, wOE!mODDING and Wicked formed for the sole purpose of writing BBS mods for SysOps who run Mystic.
