= FastEcho =

Message processing package for FTN

- Developer(s): Tobias Burchhardt
- Initial release: 1991
- Stable release: 1.46.1 / 1997
- Written in: C/C++
- Operating system: MS-DOS, OS/2
- Platform: MS-DOS, DPMI, OS/2
- Size: download archive is about 680K
- Available in: English
- Type: FidoNet mail processing software
- License: proprietary shareware
- Website: FastEcho

FastEcho is a message processing package for FTN (FidoNet Technology Network) mail systems. It was written and released as shareware by Tobias Burchhardt in 1991. The final version was 1.46.1 which was released in 1997. FastEcho was one of the fastest FTN mail processing packages available for FTN style messages. Running on MS-DOS, DPMI and native OS/2 32-bit, it offered numerous features that were desirable for leafnode systems as well as highend FTN mail distribution hubs.

== System requirements ==
FastEcho's minimum system requirements were very easy to meet. It ran on IBM PCs, XTs, ATs or compatibles with optimized routines for 386, 486, and Pentium-based and compatible machines. DOS v3.xx or IBM's OS/2 v2.x or v3.0 were the minimum required operating system platforms.

An archiver package was also needed to be able to open and seal the mail bundles. The list of supported archiver packages was PKZIP/PKUNZIP 1.10/2.04g, ARJ 2.30/2.41a, LHARC 1.13c/LHa 2.13, PKPAK/PKUNPAK 3.61, ARC 6.02, ZOO 2.10, PAK 2.51, SQZ 1.08, RAR 1.5x, and UC2 2.00. Optionally, an extractor program that automatically coped with the different decompression programs could be used. The two supported ones were General Unpack Shell (GUS) 1.90 or later and PolyXarc 2.1a or later.

== Supported software ==
Numerous FTN mailers like FrontDoor, D'Bridge, and BinkleyTerm were supported. Also supported were various Bulletin Board System packages like RemoteAccess, Maximus, QuickBBS, ProBoard, and T.A.G. Almost any BBS package could be used as long as it supported one of the three supported message base formats. They were the FTN MSG format, the HMB designed by Adam Hudson, and the JAM format. BBS users handling mail offline could also use FastEcho, as QWK and Blue Wave users did. This method was a bit more complicated but allowed the BBS user to operate much like any other FTN mail system and reap its benefits.

== Features ==
FastEcho had numerous features that were desirable on many systems. Mail distribution hubs looked for the ability to handle many downlinks as well as large numbers of message areas. FastEcho could handle up to 1024 downlinks and up to 3072 message areas. Other features:

- Support for multitasking environments such as Microsoft Windows, Quarterdeck's DESQview and OS/2
- Support for networking environments like Novell and LANtastic.
- Updating AREAS.BBS (BBS' message base configuration) with new message areas when they are created automatically.
- Transliteration of German non-ASCII characters in incoming messages when the option “Convert Umlauts” for the message area is enabled, using a certain popular character encoding as the source, although that causes messages in other encodings to get corrupted, which is a problem when the option is enabled inadvertently.

The DOS version (including DPMI) has a limit of 64 KiB per message, cutting any larger message down to that size. Worse, the default setting is 32 KiB. In OS/2 version, the maximum size is 512 KiB.

Since the release, many free alternatives emerged, but FastEcho was considered by some one of the most versatile tossers.

== Availability ==
The latest version of FastEcho, although proprietary and not improvable, is still downloadable from an official site today.

- The author's support site
- The NAFES FastEcho file area

Online support for FastEcho is also available at the North American FastEcho Support (NAFES) forum. - No longer active. Dead link.

Registration keys are available without charge on request from the author.
