= Spitfire (BBS) =

Manual for v3.2

SPITFIRE is a bulletin board system for MS-DOS released in 1987. It was written by Mike Woltz (1945-2022) and published in 1987 as shareware by his company Buffalo Creek Software of West Des Moines, Iowa.

== History ==
SPITFIRE was written in Turbo Pascal with assembly language routines. It was released in 1987 as shareware, and had a moderate sized fanbase, only outnumbered by products such as RemoteAccess, TriBBS, PCBoard, Major BBS, and Wildcat! BBS. It was possible to run multiple "nodes" of SPITFIRE under Windows and OS/2; although, most SysOps preferred to use Quarterdeck's DESQview for this purpose. SPITFIRE interfaced with message relaying systems such as FidoNet through third party utilities such as SHILOH, a QWK networking interfacing program, and BCSUTI, a Postlink-style networking interface.

SPITFIRE's most successful release (Version 3.2) came in 1992. By December 1992, there were 1523 registered copies of Spitfire still running, out of 2111 total registered to date. In October 1993, Version 3.4 was released, supporting RIPscrip graphics which offered more modern vector graphics. But in 1994, the World Wide Web exploded on the scene, and many SysOps began converting from running BBSes to becoming Internet service providers.

Due to advances in technology, SPITFIRE can be run as a telnet BBS using a virtual FOSSIL driver and Telnet engine (SIO/VMODEM under OS/2, NetFoss, NetSerial or NetModem under Windows).

SPITFIRE (version 3.6) was updated in 1999 for Y2K compliance, and its most recent release is SPITFIRE 3.7 (Released in January 2010)
