= The Bread Board System =

Popular 1980s/1990s computer bulletin board hosting software

The Bread Board System (TBBS) is a multiline MS-DOS based commercial bulletin board system software package written in 1983 by Philip L. Becker. He originally created the software as the result of a poker game with friends that were praising the BBS software created by Ward Christensen. Becker said he could do better and founded eSoft, Inc. in 1984 based on the strength of TBBS sales.

== History ==
TBBS is an abbreviation for The Bread Board System, although this explanation was buried in the documentation. This term was different because BBS was most commonly used to stand for bulletin board system. The name was chosen because it drew parallels between an electronics "breadboard" (where the basis for any circuit can be built).

TBBS started out in 1983 as a single-line BBS originally written for RadioShack TRS-80 machines and was later ported to IBM-PC computers. Its advantage was that it could be fully customized by the system operator so that no two TBBS systems looked the same. Other BBS packages at the time had their menu structures hard-coded.

As time progressed, Phil completely rewrote the TBBS program in assembler to operate on IBM PCs running under MS-DOS. In 1988, he added a custom multitasking kernel that allowed multiple callers to access the TBBS system at the same time. Other BBS software packages could only achieve simultaneous user access by either running their software on LAN systems, dedicating one complete machine per modem, or under multitasking software such as Quarterdeck's DESQview. TBBS achieved multiple lines all on the one machine. For those wishing to run two lines, no additional hardware was needed - you only needed to use COM1 and COM2. For those wishing to run more lines, multiport serial boards from a company called Digiboard were used to allow up to 96 modems to be hooked into the one machine. At its height in 1996, TBBS could support more simultaneous users at full speed on less hardware than any competing BBS product.

Many software companies, like Microsoft, and most computer hardware companies all around the world relied on TBBS for their online technical support and file download services until Internet web and FTP sites replaced the need for a direct dial BBS presence in the mid-1990s.

== Option Modules ==
Add-On "option modules" were used to internally extend the TBBS feature set.

- TDBS (The Data Base System) was a dBase3-compatible compiled language that supported creation of multiline applications and games without having to exit the TBBS environment via batch files (or drop files), making it more stable than its competitors.
- TIMS (The Integrated Mail System) was released to allow interaction with FidoNet technology.
- QSO was released to allow users to use the popular QWK message format for offline mail reading.
- SYSOM was released to give the sysop real-time control over files and user accounts and menu flags without bringing the TBBS system down.
- Interchange was released to allow the TBBS system to grab outgoing modem lines to dial other services, networking multiple BBS systems together.
- TIGER (The Internet Gateway and E-Mail Router) was an option module that facilitated Internet email and Usenet newsgroup connectivity to TBBS via UUCP. TIGER was originally developed and sold by Boardwatch Magazine editor Jack Rickard under the name PIMP (Personal Internet Mail Processor). eSoft acquired and renamed the product in May 1995.
- UltraChat was a flexible chat module that included default configurations to emulate popular chat systems from competing products and was released as optional alternative to the default chat feature.

All in all, TBBS and its option modules were far beyond the performance and reliability of what other BBS authors could dream of. TBBS had power not even anticipated by the author. For example, in 1988 the University of Southern California installed TBBS for their 16-line BBS system administered by Susan Biddlecomb, who was Director of Computer Support of the USC Health Care system. The actual computer was housed in the computer facility, some distance from her office, necessitating her to go to the computer facility to make the most minor change. Her solution was to completely dispense with the internal menu and interface system, devising a standard menu layout, and building menus “on the fly” using the add-on TDBS module.

She would upload any changes or additions to the menus as entries in the database, and remotely recompile the menus. After a daily reboot, the changes would automatically take effect without the necessity for a trip to the computer room. A side benefit was dynamic content—upon registration or login, the user could enter or change any information, such as personal information, preferences, or sub-boards of interest. This information was entered into the database, and this would then dynamically customize the menu system presented to the user, and no two users were necessarily presented with the same information. This meant that the entire interface seen by the users was in actuality an add-on running under TDBS, with the main program functioning merely as a multi-tasker. A similar concept is widely used today on the World Wide Web as database-driven content, one of its most powerful features. E-Soft did not publicize this method of constructing the menu system and left it up to the users to discover the power of this advanced implementation.

== IPAD ==
In 1993, Phil Becker saw the approaching commercial migration to the Internet and started work on the IPAD (Internet Protocol Adapter) project. It was designed as an embedded hardware and software solution that originally focused on bidirectional telnet access to TBBS. It also provided other services (RAS, DNS, FTP, etc.) for those TBBS callers on dial in lines using the IPAD machine as a direct gateway. This allowed many IPAD owners to more easily become Internet service providers (ISPs) as BBS usage on the whole began to wane, caused by the growing popularity of the Internet.

The IPAD was highly popular among commercial TBBS operators. However, it was very expensive and out of reach for most hobbyist TBBS sysops, who had already invested thousands of dollars into TBBS and its optional modules for use on free systems with no hope of ever making a profit.

== Aftermath ==
eSoft and TBBS went their separate ways as eSoft pursued the Internet market. All new TBBS development ended in 1997 and by the end of 1999 all technical support for TBBS and associated products officially ended. New TBBS sales continued through 2003 as part of vertical applications built with the TDBS language.

TBBS was until recently supported by a user support forum at TBBS.org. IPAD is currently developed and supported by the IPAD Owners Association, Inc. eSoft is located in Broomfield, Colorado.
