= ASCII Express =

ASCII Express, also known as AE, is a telecommunications software developed specifically for the Apple II personal computers. Throughout the 1980s, ASCII Express garnered a reputation as the preferred programme among telecommunications enthusiasts and users. Its functionality and compatibility with the Apple II made it a staple in the early computer communications era.

== ASCII Express II ==
ASCII Express II
- Original author: Bill Blue
- Final release: v1.0 / 1980
- Successor: ASCII Express Pro

The inaugural version of ASCII Express, known as AE II, was developed by Bill Blue in 1980 and distributed by Southwestern Data Systems. AE II was designed for compatibility with any Apple II running DOS 3.x and supported a select array of modems that were available during that time, including the popular Hayes Micromodem II.

The software primarily facilitated user connection to both paid and free bulletin board systems (BBSs), notably THE SOURCE and CompuServe. The AE II interface was menu-driven, providing a straightforward user experience with a limited set of functions when compared to the extensive capabilities of contemporary telecommunications software, lacking advanced features like terminal emulation and multi-file transfer protocols such as YMODEM or ZMODEM.

== ASCII Express The Professional ==
ASCII Express Pro
- Original authors: Bill Blue and Mark Robbins
- Release: 1982
- Final release: v1.3 / 1985
- Predecessor: ASCII Express

Development on ASCII Express II concluded in 1982, making way for its successor, "ASCII Express Professional," more commonly known as "AE Pro." This new version, a collaborative effort by Bill Blue and Mark Robbins, represented a significant overhaul. AE Pro was a command-line-driven telecommunications programme enriched with features that its predecessor lacked, such as scripting capabilities, YMODEM and ZMODEM protocols, terminal emulation, and support for the Apple ProDOS 8 operating system. Moreover, when set up as a host, AE Pro could function as a rudimentary BBS (Bulletin Board System), known as an AE line, allowing users to dial-in for file exchanges.

Initially, Roger Wagner of Southwestern Data Systems distributed the earlier iterations of AE Pro, with later distributions managed by United Software Industries, co-founded by Mark Robbins, Bill Blue, and others. A notable achievement was Greg Schaefer's conversion of AE Pro from Apple DOS 3.3 to Apple ProDOS in a single afternoon, a feat that earned him a reward of $5000.

In 1984, Bill Blue and Joe Holt embarked on adapting AE Pro for MS-DOS and the 8086 assembly language. The subsequent year, Joe Holt and Greg Schaefer completely rewrote AE Pro for the Apple II, integrating the system's new mouse and MouseText capabilities. They released this iteration under the name MouseTalk, which included advanced scripting functions and a comprehensive mouse-based text editor. However, ProTERM, a more sophisticated telecommunications program that leveraged the advanced capabilities of the Apple IIe and IIc, including 65C02 opcodes, mouse support, and macros, quickly eclipsed the prominence of AE Pro and MouseTalk.

== Peer to peer file sharing ==
The proliferation of Apple II-based Bulletin Board Systems (BBSs) in the early 1980s paved the way for a new digital landscape. Initially, these platforms served primarily as message boards. However, with the advent of hacking software like Dalton's Disc Disintegrator (DDD), Apple II users began to explore the nascent capabilities of peer-to-peer file sharing. They could compress unprotected floppy discs into multiple files and transfer these to other users, thus setting the stage for one of the earliest forms of peer-to-peer file transfer.

Although other Apple II telecom programs, such as DiskFur and CatFur, could facilitate complete disk and file transfers, the concept of a portal emerged as a solution to meet the collaborative needs of software enthusiasts and those involved in the exchange of unlicensed software.

Among nearly all BBS software, including GBBS and Networks II, ASCII Express Professional (AE Pro) stood out as the only telecom programme accessible through an undocumented feature. This one-of-a-kind feature let system operators (sysops) manage AE lines and control user access through accounts. This made it possible for the growing international Warez communities to connect, even though many users got around normal ways of connecting by phreaking.

Following the success of AE Pro, developers developed derivatives like PAE (Pseudo ASCII Express—"Written by a Pirate for Pirates") and PAE ProDOS as free add-ons to GBBS. Unlike AE, these spin-offs provided openly available source code, enhancing their appeal and accessibility. Later, in the 1990s, Celerity BBS, a popular MS-DOS-based system, introduced a "CAE" (Celerity ASCII Express) mode. This feature provided callers with a streamlined file transfer system that did not require any user records, further simplifying the file exchange process.

== Reception ==
II Computing listed ASCII Express Professional tenth on the magazine's list of top Apple II non-game, non-educational software as of late 1985, based on sales and market-share data.
