= Blue Board (software) =

Bulletin board system software

Blue Board is a bulletin board system software created by Martin Sikes (1968–2007) for the Commodore 64 in the 1980s in Vancouver, British Columbia, Canada, and sold worldwide. Due to optimized code and memory allocation, Blue Board boasted very fast performance for a BBS on that hardware platform. In fact, Blue Board was faster than most if not all BBSs run on 8-bit computers. This speed combined with its use of the ASCII character set and XModem file transfer protocol rather than PETSCII and the Commodore-specific Punter protocol sometimes led users to believe that they were calling a BBS running on a much larger and faster computer.

Developer Sikes originally created Blue Board for his own BBS, called Blue Hell, which he ran from his home under the pseudonym "Beelzebub." He later went on to an Electrical Engineering degree from the University of British Columbia, then a long career in the video game industry, including as co-founder of Black Box Games (now part of Electronic Arts, where he worked as a programmer on the Need for Speed series of racing games, among others), before his sudden death while sleeping on December 24, 2007, at age 39.

== Technical innovations ==
Among BBS software available in its day, Blue Board was notable in that it made creative use of the computer's limited RAM space, including the shadow RAM behind its ROMs, to store frequently-referenced data such as usernames, passwords, and message headers. This allowed the BBS to bypass the C64's notoriously slow floppy disk system for many functions. The text of the message bases was kept on floppy disk in RWTS (Read/Write/Track/Sector) mode, bypassing the performance limitations of the 1541 floppy disk drive's file system. In addition, the entire BBS program was written in 6510 assembly code, further improving both speed and memory efficiency. Another extremely clever innovation was the use of a trick of perception to make the board seem even faster. Sikes was unable to eliminate a slight, but noticeable pause before displaying the main prompt, as the software had to do some serious CPU crunching before it was ready for user input. So he split up the processes into groups and executed each group of routines in between displaying a single character on a line, followed by a carriage return, after which it would perform another processing group, before displaying two characters and a carriage return, more processing, and finally displaying three characters, a carriage return and then the main prompt. The default character was an asterisk (*), but could be changed to any character by the sysop. Because the software was displaying these series of characters and carriage returns in between processes, the delay before displaying the main prompt was rendered imperceptible.

Blue Board was one of the first BBSes, and probably the first Commodore 64 BBS, to support features such as voting and one-liners which they called "scribbles." Additionally, it reserved a small block of the C64's memory space for external programs that could include additional file transfer capability, or rudimentary games that presaged the door games that would become enormously popular on later BBSes.

== Limitations ==
Because all user accounts and message headers are stored in the C64's limited RAM, which had to be shared with the program itself, the program only supported up to nine message areas and nine download file areas. Further limitations include a maximum of 239 user accounts, and a four-character password length.

Each time the BBS was started, the sysop would have to manually enter the time of day, because the Commodore 64 has no real-time clock hardware.

In addition, starting up the program was cumbersome. First, the program itself had to be loaded and run, then the RAM-resident user and message data had to be loaded, and then the disk had to be replaced with the message text disk. The whole process took several minutes.

== Supported hardware ==
- Commodore 64 or 128
- Commodore 1541, 1571, 1581 disk drives

If the primary drive was the double-sided 1571, Blue Board could use both sides of the disk, one for the message text and one for download files.

- Hard drives that interfaced as floppy disks, with a device number and CBM-DOS compatible command set.
- Epyx Fast Load Cartridge
- 1650, 1670 and compatible modems

== Decline in popularity ==
At the peak of Blue Board's popularity (the latter half of the 1980s), many Blue Boards were in operation, and the software was widely pirated. As 8-bit computing fell into decline, so did Blue Board. The availability of more powerful hardware such as the Amiga, Macintosh, and entry-level PCs made feasible the development of more powerful BBS software in high-level languages without the need for the kind of extensive optimization employed by Blue Board. However, Blue Board was instrumental in the social development of online culture in Vancouver which relied on text messages and email rather than file downloading, so it remained perfectly suited for that purpose long after the C64 platform became obsolete. It was not unusual in the early 1990s to find Blue Boards still thriving while BBSes run on far more powerful computers languished or were relegated to shareware file depositories. The real death-knell to Blue Board was the rise of multi-line chat systems, starting with DDial and progressing to STS and MajorBBS. It is not known whether any Blue Boards are still operational today.
