= Canada Remote Systems =

Canada Remote Systems, or simply CRS, was a major commercial bulletin board system located in the Toronto area. It was one of the earliest commercial systems outside the "big iron" companies such as CompuServe or The Source. At times it was among the largest BBS systems in the world, often trading that position with the US-based Exec-PC, based on the number of telephone lines and its 10,000 user subscriber base. It won the 1992 Readers Choice award in Boardwatch Magazine. It survived into the 1990s, before being overwhelmed by the Internet and closing down.

== History ==
CRS was founded by Jud Newell in 1979 as Mississauga RCP/M, a small one-line system running on RCP/M on CP/M that later became Toronto RCP/M after a move. It became CRS when Newell decided to make the growing system a full-time job in 1985, moving from CP/M to MS-DOS and from RCP/M to the then top-of-the-line PCBoard system. It grew over the next few years to become one of the first large BBS systems, which allowed its users to carry on conversations with thousands of local residents. At the time the average BBS system was run on a single 300 or 1200 baud modem and had extremely limited storage space for messages or files (hard drives were not yet common). At the other end of the scale, larger online services offered thousands of files and messages, but at a fairly high per-hour cost. CRS offered a practical middle ground between the expensive mainframe systems and the local BBS, both in terms of pricing and features. By 1989, the system had grown to 87 lines as well as three connections for long-distance users over DATAPAC and Telenet.

During the late 1980s the growth of the FidoNet upset this balance somewhat. Now a user could call into their local free BBS system and have conversations with users from all over the world—although practically this was limited to North America at the time. PCBoard did support a Fido-like system known as RelayNet (or RIME), but this was supported by PCBoard only and thus had a much smaller amount of traffic than the platform independent Fido. For some time CRS offered RelayNet hub service known as NAnet to other PCBoard operators throughout North America in order to increase the user base, going so far as to offer a 1-800 number for these BBSes to call in on.

CRS's file area remained its major draw, with a library hosted on a number of networked servers that no small BBS could hope to match. Through the late 1980s and into the 1990s they added considerable amounts of storage and greatly improved modem speeds. In 1992 they could claim to be the largest PCBoard system in the world with over 250 lines and about 10,000 paid members. Throughout this period their main competitor in Canada was another Toronto PCBoard based system, Rose Media, but Rose remained smaller at about 50 lines.

Their aggressive growth was also expensive, and forced the company into receivership in August 1990, with a sizable debt primarily owed to Bell Canada. A group of private investors then purchased the system and restarted the company. By 1991 Jud had left the company. He was briefly involved with the formation of the Toronto Free-Net before eventually leaving the industry. In 1992, CRS changed its name to CRS Online and added another BBS system aimed at online chat, which PCBoard did not support very well, at least in large multi-machine installations. In late 1994, CRS introduced a Windows-based Internet access service called Frontier that incorporated standard Internet functions including email, news and gopher, as well as access to its large file library. FTP and Telnet access were also added.

In March 1995, CRS was acquired by Delrina to serve as the foundation of Delrina's push into the services market. Within months of this acquisition, Delrina was itself acquired by Symantec, a US-based software company with little interest beyond Delrina's core software products, notably WinFax. In January 1996, Symantec sold CRS to Ottawa-based internet service provider, iStar Internet. It appears their interest was primarily in CRS's customers, which they absorbed into its standard Internet access offerings. CRS itself quickly disappeared.
