= RelayNet =

RelayNet was an e-mail exchange network used by PCBoard bulletin board systems (BBS's). By 1990, RelayNet comprised more than 200 bulletin board systems. BBS's on RelayNet communicated via a communications protocol called RIME (RelayNet International Mail Exchange).

RelayNet was similar to FidoNet in purpose and technology, although it used names for its nodes instead of Fido's numeric address pairs. Due to it being limited to PCBoard, it carried a much smaller amount of traffic than Fido. RIME was built up, starting in 1988, from a master hub owned by Bonnie Anthony, a local psychiatrist, in Bethesda, Maryland and a subordinate hub owned by her brother, Howard Belasco, in The Bronx, New York. Kip Compton, in high-school at the time, played an important role in the software's development and evolution. Dr. Anthony died in 2015.

PCBoard, created by Clark Development Corporation (CDC) in Salt Lake City, Utah, was always a "premium" BBS system and fairly expensive. For this reason it was limited mostly to larger multi-line BBS systems, where it was particularly well liked due to its "nice" behaviour on the network when running off a common file server. However this also meant that the PCBoard market generally consisted of a small number of large systems, as opposed to a large number of small ones, hence RIME had usually only a few hundred member boards.

Thus RelayNet, which originally ran only on PCBoard, did not have the same level of infrastructure as FidoNet, and didn't build the sort of global organizational structure that FidoNet needed. Instead, RelayNet evolved as a series of smaller regional networks, including the NANET hosted by Canada Remote Systems, RoseNet hosted by their competitors Rose Media, QuebecNet, FINET, Smartnet, Intelec, ILink, U'NI-net, Friendsnet and others.

RelayNet software later appeared for a variety of other BBS systems, including RBBS, GAP, EIS, QBBS and Wildcat! BBS, but these systems also provided excellent FidoNet support and RelayNet was never popular on anything other than PCBoard and its close competitor, RBBS-PC.

On August 1, 2007, Don Barba, owner since the late 1990s of the RIME network, its software, and since the late 1980s of Moondog, its central BBS in Brooklyn, New York, announced that all would close on August 15.

== See also ==
- FidoNet
- Usenet
