= Searchlight (disambiguation) =

A searchlight is a device to illuminate the sky while searching for aircraft.

Searchlight may also refer to:

== Arts and entertainment ==
- Search-Light, a publication by William George Jordan
- Searchlight (album), a 1989 album by Runrig
- Searchlight (short story), a 1962 science fiction short story by Robert A. Heinlein
- Searchlights (album), a 2009 album by Abandon
- "Searchlights", a song by Falling Up from the album Dawn Escapes
- "Searchlight" (song), a song by Shinedown

== Businesses and organizations ==
- Searchlight Pictures, a film studio
- Searchlight Capital Partners, a private equity firm
- Searchlight BBS, developer of Searchlight BBS software (SLBBS)

== Other uses ==
- Searchlight (India), an English-language newspaper published in India
- Searchlight (magazine), a British anti-fascist magazine
- Operation Searchlight, a military pacification program carried out by the Pakistan Army in 1971, in Bangladesh
- Searchlight (workshops), workshops and home founded by Matron Powell in Denton, Sussex
- Searchlight, Nevada, a town in Clark County, Nevada, United States
  - Searchlight Airport
- Searchlight signal, a type of railway signal
- Searchlight, an annual Canadian music competition mounted by CBC Music

== See also ==
- Spotlight (disambiguation)
- Search (disambiguation)
- Light (disambiguation)
