= Searchlight BBS =

- Original author: Frank LaRosa
- Developers: Searchlight Software (1987–1998); TeleGrafix Communications
- Release: 1985
- Final release: 5.1 / February 6, 1999
- Written in: Microsoft Level III BASIC; Turbo Pascal
- Operating system: DOS
- Platform: IBM PC compatible; TRS-80
- Available in: English
- Type: Bulletin board system
- License: Shareware

Searchlight BBS is a bulletin board system (BBS) developed in 1985 by Frank LaRosa for the TRS-80. LaRosa formed a company, Searchlight Software, through which he marketed and sold Searchlight BBS. In 1987, LaRosa expanded the software and sold it as shareware written for the PC in Pascal (using Turbo Pascal). The features of Searchlight BBS included a full screen text editor, a remote DOS shell, and file transfer via the XMODEM protocol. Searchlight BBS rapidly grew in popularity, and appeared frequently in Boardwatch magazine and at BBS conventions across the United States. Eventually, Searchlight BBS supported FidoNet, ZMODEM, Internet e-mail and telnet connectivity.

In 1995 LaRosa began work on Spinnaker Web Server, to compete with Netscape and other web server software. Searchlight Software sold Searchlight BBS, along with Spinnaker Web Server, to TeleGrafix Communications in 1998.
