= XQT =

XQT may refer to:

- The IATA location identifier for Lichfield Trent Valley railway station - Lichfield (UK)
- The ISO 639-3 language code for Qatabanian
- A file extension for Waffle executable files or SuperCalc macro sheets.
