= C-Net =

C-Net, C-net, CNet, Cnet, or CNET may refer to:

- CNET or c|net, an American media website about technology and consumer electronics
- C-Net DS2 or CNet DS2, bulletin board software for Commodore 64 computer system since 1986
  - C-Net or C=Net, an ancestor edition of the C-Net DS2 bulletin board software for the Commodore computer system
  - C-Net 128, C-Net Amiga, and CNet Amiga Pro, other editions of the C-Net bulletin board software for the Commodore computer system
- Centre national d'études des télécommunications, a national telecommunications research institute in France from 1944 to 2000
- c-net, a type of polyhedral graph
