= C-Net DS2 =

Bulletin board system software for Commodore 64

C-Net DS2 (Developers System, Second Generation) was a full featured, single-line, bulletin board system (BBS) software system released in 1986 for the Commodore 64 microcomputer. The DS2 system was notable in that its authors proved that it was possible to perform significant and useful serious computing tasks on a hardware platform with such severely limited resources that even the manufacturer called it only a "game machine".

The Commodore-64 was a simple computer, based on the MOS Technology 6502 8-bit microprocessor, with 64 kilobytes of RAM, only 38k of which was available for program code and variables that could be used by the built-in BASIC programming language interpreter. Nevertheless, several different BBS programs were developed (including DS2) by various independent programmers (mostly hobbyists not affiliated with any large software publisher) that enabled a System Operator (SysOp) to run a single-user, multiple member online community supporting threaded topical discussions, on-line games; information reference library, live chat mode with the console operator, file-sharing library and the ability to create a customized user experience in BASIC, thus the Developers System title.

From an engineering standpoint, C-Net DS2 was remarkable in its use of machine language modules, early multitasking technology, relocatable code, and modular program overlays. Although the user experience was entirely text-based and non-graphical, fast performance could be attained through the use of memory expansion modules, IEEE-488 interface hard drives, and modem speeds including the mid-1980s state of the art 19,200 bit/s.

Although the emergence of widely available public internet services has made private BBS systems obsolete in most of the developed free world, a dedicated core of enthusiasts continue to tinker with vintage computers and keep software like DS2 running, despite the quaint limitations of the simple linear message threading system and the primitive keyboard-based, non-graphical games.

C-Net 64 DS2 also had networking capabilities using Gary O'Brien's DS2 Network developed in 1989. This modification or add-on to C-Net DS2 BBS allowed it to connect to other C-Net BBS's and transfer a single file packet composed of all messages, email and stats from online games since the last connection. The packet would be uploaded to the receiving BBS and another packet tagged for that BBS would be downloaded. Both systems would then sort and file the packets on their systems making the new information available on each system. Gary continued to develop DS2 Network until mid-1993, then turned over rights and development to Michael Bendure.

Michael eventually took over support and distribution of both C-Net 64 DS2 BBS and DS2 Network from 1993 to 1998. An article in Commodore World Magazine; Issue 3 Volume 1, Number 3 that detailed DS2 Network features and network structure was published in 1994. Michael worked with BBS programmers on other platforms to develop a standard packet structure that all BBS Networks could convert into their existing Networks. This project later became known as CommNet and covered hundreds of BBS's all over the world running C-Net DS2, C-Net 128, Image, Color64 and even some FidoNet BBS's. C-Net DS2 is currently in development.
