= Graphics BBS =

Graphics BBS (GBBS) was a bulletin board system server developed from 1989 to 1992 by Eric Anderson as part of his thesis at Chisholm Institute of Technology. Although it had superior graphics capabilities compared to RIP, it was harder to integrate into existing BBS's, and so was ultimately less popular.

GBBS allowed sending graphics defined by BASIC commands, as well as GIF images. Since the images were cached between sessions, each image only needed to be downloaded once, so these connections were often as fast as a text BBS.

The software was primarily used around Melbourne until the Internet killed the old bulletin boards.
