= The Common Link =

Swedish bulletin board system

The Common Link, TCL, was a Swedish bulletin board system system developed by Ulf Hedlund in the late 1980s. It was based on the capabilities of the KOM conferencing system used at many Swedish universities, and distinguished itself from the other major FidoNet BBS systems at the time by its support for topic threading and its non-hierarchical command interface. It used a Btrieve database for information storage. There were only about 30 TCL BBSs in Sweden and only one outside the country.

One of the oldest, still operational BBSs in the world, -=P=I=X=-, is still running, without interruption, TCL since 1989.
