= RoboBOARD/FX =

- Original author: Seth Hamilton
- Developer: Hamilton TeleGraphics Inc
- Initial release: 1993; 33 years ago
- Type: BBS

RoboBOARD/FX was the third generation Bulletin Board System hosting package released by Hamilton TeleGraphics Inc of Canada, programmed by owner Seth Hamilton in 1993. It was the follow-up to ROBO-BOARD Pro and ROBO-BOARD Plus which first utilized groundbreaking Remote Imaging Protocol developed by TeleGrafix Communications, which was also known as RIPscrip.

At a time when most BBS software was entirely text-based, with some using color ANSI art for welcome screens, and their menu prompts as color text, RoboBOARD started a revolution. It was the first fully graphical BBS system with iconic navigation, punchy bitmaps, and vector fonts, all at a time when ultra-fast high-speed modems were barely clocking 2400 bit/s.

RoboBOARD/FX improved upon that advancement, by creating a terminal program/hosting package that provided a familiar looking graphical user interface for DOS, complete with dragging windows, clicking buttons, scrollbars, pop up dialogue boxes and templates. In this GUI environment RoboBOARD/FX supported graphics modes of up to 1024 x 768 in 16/256 SVGA color. One of the biggest improvements RoboBOARD/FX brought into the BBS world was it built-in photographic capabilities, which allowed a BBS to display images to its users in real-time, without requiring a pre-download.

These innovations allowed small, independent BBS operators to offer a service that looked very much like the large commercial online services, such as America Online and CompuServe. Unfortunately this came at about the same time when the World Wide Web exploded onto the scene, and many BBS systems shut down as their operators started Internet service providers (ISPs) instead. NCSA Mosaic released also in 1993 gave users color and graphics by displaying HTML, which was open-source, unlike the commercial only RoboBOARD/FX.
