= Forum 80 =

Bulletin board system software

Forum 80 refers to a BBS software created in 1980 by Bill Abney of Kansas City (MO) in the US for running a BBS on a Tandy TRS 80 computer. The software, and the name is most notable for being the first BBS in the UK.

The Forum 80 BBS was set up in late 1980/early 1981 in Kingston upon Hull in the north of England by Frederick Brown, a computer enthusiast. It featured in many articles in computer magazines at the time, not just for being the first BBS, but also for Brown's way of treating the delicate computer equipment. It was noted on several occasions that he had removed the covers from the two 5 1/4" that contained the system and that they were under an open window in a shed in his back garden and all the equipment was covered in a layer of cigarette ash.

Frederick Brown later went on to create AFPAS, the Association of Free Public Access Systems, which was set up to bring together sysops and BBS users and became an information service for people to contact for help in accessing UK BBS's. He did this with co-sysop Neil Douglas Barnby, who also went on later to create other BBS systems.

Forum 80 was used by many of the first bulletin boards set up in the UK but was later replaced by Fidonet.
