= Virtual Advanced =

- Developer: Roland De Graaf
- Release: 1990
- Stable release: 2.10
- Operating system: MS-DOS / OS/2
- Type: Bulletin board system
- License: Proprietary
- Website: http://www.virtualc.com/ (defunct)

VBBS is an acronym for Virtual Bulletin Board System. It was a shareware bulletin board system (BBS) for DOS (and later OS/2) that was conceived by Roland De Graaf in 1990. Written from scratch in QuickBASIC, it developed a loyal following. Originally it was a door for WWIV, but quickly grew into an original BBS concept on its own. By 1993, there were thousands of computers running VBBS around the world. VirtualNET, the largest VBBS message network, had close to 1500 members by version 6.14 in 1993.

Up to this time, VBBS remained shareware, but in 1994 Roland released version 7.0 as a commercial product. The lifetime registrations of prior versions were not honored for this version and required anyone who wished to use this version to pay. While some did decide to pay again for the upgrade, others became unsatisfied and began looking for other alternatives. There would not be another release of VBBS.

Instead, Roland switched gears again in 1995. He released Virtual Advanced (VADV) as the successor to VBBS. VADV contained many improvements to the old system. One notable feature was a much more powerful scripting language. It was a step forward for the software but once again SysOps were required to purchase the new software.

Virtual Advanced would finally reach version 2.10. This version along with its companion, the Virtual Internet Survivor Kit (VISK) v1.30, would show that it indeed was "advanced" for its time. With the growing trend of the Internet, VADV now supported features such as POP3, SMTP, NNTP, WWW and Finger.

Ultimately, with the rise of the Internet, costs of upgrades and tensions within the support network, Virtual Advanced all but faded away.

In 1998, Roland, who was legally blind, suffered a detached retina in his good eye and had to have immediate surgery to repair it. It would take years for him to recover and he never returned to the BBS scene.

Virtual Advanced was frozen in its current state. Only a handful of systems survived with the disappearance of its creator. VirtualNET did not survive.

In late 1999, Steve Winn, a loyal VBBS supporter and script writer, began to help revive the dying software. He and other loyal supporters began to rekindle interest in the software. A support site was born and from it grew AspectNet, a support network.

In 2002, Steve created the VADV-PHP project. This was a web front-end for Virtual Advanced. Users could access the BBS functions using a familiar web interface.

In 2003, a telnet server was developed by John Tipton called VADV32. A version 2.0 was released in 2005,.

VirtualNET was reborn in early 2005. The six-year-old support network AspectNet would surrender its existence to allow the rebirth.
