= Net-Works II =

Apple II bulletin board system software

- Original author: Nick Naimo
- Initial release: c. 1980; 46 years ago
- Operating system: Apple DOS; ProDOS
- Platform: Apple II
- Type: Bulletin board system
- License: Proprietary

Net-Works II is a bulletin board system software package written by Nick Naimo for the Apple II. It was originally published in the early 1980s. For a time it was the most popular bulletin board system software for the Apple II, out of the dozen or so released.

== Development and history ==
Nick Naimo (born c. 1945 in New York City) developed Net-Works II independently in the early 1980s as a member of Computer Station, a BBS provider based in Missouri. He split amicably from Computer Station to work full-time for Advanced Data Systems, a start-up software developer in St. Louis, Missouri, who developed exclusively for the Apple II. Version 2.2 of Net-Works was released by the company in June 1982. While working at Advanced Data Systems, Naimo also served as city councilman for the suburb of Maplewood, Missouri. Naimo quit Advanced Data Systems sometime in 1982 to work for the IT department of a printing press in St. Louis before relocating in Newburgh, Indiana, to work for Better Business Computers & Systems, a computer store and software publisher based in nearby Vincennes. Net-Works II was one of several applications Naimo wrote for Advanced Data Systems; others included an accounting program for small businesses and an inventory program for retailers.

A year after its introduction, Advanced Data Systems transferred the publishing rights for Net-Works II to High Technology Software Products of Oklahoma City, Oklahoma. High Technology Software continued selling Net-Works II into the late 1980s.

== Features ==
Features of Net-Works II include:

- Text-based user interface
- Individual usernames and passwords
- Message boards, called forums
- Support for the Thunderware ThunderClock and compatible cards
- Chat mode between the sysop and user
- Administrative tools
- Applesoft BASIC, Integer BASIC, and binary program downloading

== Reception and popularity ==
Net-Works II received a rave review in InfoWorld, with John Prather writing that the "combination of the personal computer and software such as Net-Works II may well be responsible for a phenomenon that will be the 80s equivalent of the CB radio of the 70s". He gave top marks to the software's performance, error handling, and ease of use, calling it "an extremely easy-to-use program, both from the standpoint of the sysop and of system users". Author Dean Gengle in his book The Netweaver's Sourcebook (1984) called Net-Works II "the best general-purpose bulletin board system" for the Apple II family. The software package by the mid-1980s was a massive success, with the 1986 edition of Stewart Brand's Whole Earth Software Catalog calling it "the most popular of nearly a dozen Apple II bulletin board programs". In July 1984, roughly sixty BBSes were running Net-Works II, according to Softalk. Writer Matt Yuen wrote that the quality of the Net-Works-based BBSes varied greatly.

The gambling personality Jerry L. Patterson opened a BBS running Net-Works II out of South Jersey in March 1984.

== See also ==
- List of Apple II BBS software
