= Searchlight (India) =

Indian English-language daily newspaper

The Searchlight
- Type: Daily newspaper
- Format: Broadsheet
- Founder(s): Sachchidananda Sinha; Rajendra Prasad
- Publisher: The Behar Journals
- Editor: Murli Manohar Prasad
- Founded: 15 July 1918; 108 years ago
- Language: English
- Headquarters: Patna, Bihar, India
- Country: India
- OCLC number: 786174696

The Searchlight was an English-language newspaper published in Patna, Bihar, India, that played a significant role in the Indian freedom movement. It was established in 1918 by Dr. Sachchidananda Sinha & Rajendra Prasad and was initially a biweekly, later becoming a tri-weekly and then a daily. The newspaper was known for its nationalist outlook and its criticism of British policies, often facing legal battles and fines for its outspokenness.

== Nationalist voice ==
The newspaper was a strong advocate for India's independence and actively participated in the freedom struggle. It published articles that criticized British rule and inspired people to join the movement.
