= PCBoard =

Bulletin board system (BBS) application

- PCBoard 15.3 with a file flagger PPE
- Developers: Clark Development Company, Inc.
- Release: 1983; 43 years ago
- Final release: 15.3 / September 1996; 30 years ago
- Preview release: 15.4 beta / June 1997; 29 years ago
- Operating system: DOS / OS/2
- Type: Bulletin board system
- License: Proprietary
- Website: (defunct)

PCBoard (PCB) was a bulletin board system (BBS) application first introduced for DOS in 1983 by Fred Clark's Clark Development Company (CDC). PCBoard was one of the first commercial BBS packages for DOS systems, and was considered one of the "high end" packages during the rapid expansion of BBS systems in the early 1990s. PCB was used as the basis of some of the largest bulletin board systems of the era, like Canada Remote Systems.

PCB was notable for its support of large multi-line BBS systems, which it supported by running multiple copies of the program, either using multitasking systems like DESQview or on multiple physical machines using shared storage. The system was licensed by the number of lines it would support; the majority of the systems were the basic two-line license, but it was also offered in 5, 10, 25, 50, 100, 250 and 1000 line systems. A native 32-bit IBM OS/2 version became also available with PCB V15.22 and higher. There were also a few tools available for PCBoard, which were specifically developed for the OS/2 2.0 and OS/2 Warp operating system.

Like many BBS companies, the rise of the World Wide Web starting around 1994 led to serious downturns in fortunes, and CDC went bankrupt in 1997.

== Multinode support ==
PCBoard supported the 16C550 universal asynchronous receiver-transmitter (UART) devices, such as 16550 UART ("Fifo"), 16554 UART and 16650 UART, which made it possible to run multiple nodes of the BBS on a single (multitasking) computer using either using IBM OS/2 or the DOS multitasking tool DESQview in combination with the memory manager QEMM. Some sysops reported mixed results running PCBoard on Windows 95 when it first came out.. Stability was critical for a BBS, which was usually running 24/7, and the early version of the 32-bit operating system lacked it. Windows 95 was never officially supported by CDC.

Standard PCs then and today have only one or two (if any) serial ports (a.k.a. COM ports), which are needed to connect an external modem to a computer. This made multiport cards like the G-Tek "BlackBoard", "BBS550" or "SmartCard" and the "DigiBoard" by Digi International popular among sysops. Other options were internal multi-modem cards and multiple computers connected by local area network (LAN).

PCBoard also supports Integrated Services Digital Network (ISDN) and Telnet access via the Internet. The open source terminal emulator SyncTERM, available for Win32, Linux, FreeBSD, NetBSD, OpenBSD, Solaris and Mac OS X can be used for example to connect to the few remaining PCBoard BBS installations that are connected to the Internet.

== Multi-BBS networks ==
Starting in 1988, the RelayNet, also known as RIME for RelayNet International Mail Exchange, allowed BBS's running PCBoard to join a network that exchanged messages with other BBS's in a system similar to the older FidoNet.

== Metadata ==
PCBoard used two files for BBS metadata: FILE_ID.DIZ and DESC.SDI. When a user uploaded a file, a short description (a line or two) was read from either user input or FILE_ID.DIZ (from inside the ZIP file) and an extended description – multi-line text explaining the file in detail – was saved in a separate file named DESC.SDI. The file name extension .SDI stands for supplemental description information.

CDC pioneered the FILE_ID.DIZ format which became widely used by various BBS providers.

== Scripting ==
CDC developed PCBoard Programming Language (PPL) – a scripting language, which supported modifications and to a large degree replacement of most standard commands and processes. A compiled interpreter script written in PPL was called a PCBoard Programming Executable (PPE). PPEs were generated by the PPL Compiler (PPLC), which was an optional tool provided by CDC and was also available for purchase as a standalone tool. It was less than $100 by itself and less than $50 in combination with any BBS license. It allowed programmers to develop PPEs for PCBoard without having to purchase a PCBoard BBS license.

Also available were the printed PCBoard manual and the printed PPLC reference handbook.

== History ==
The first version of PCBoard was released in 1983.

PPL was introduced with version 15.0.

Various BBS door programs were in use, including Sam Smith's Prodoor, which added a full screen editor and other features which were later included in PCBoard itself.

The script language PPL and PPE's which became more and more available, increased the popularity of PCBoard and emerged by the mid-nineties as the de facto standard BBS system for warez BBS on the IBM PC. As a warez BBS generally used pirated software, this use did not appear in official sales or usage statistic for PCBoard.

Despite the high price tag CDC sold more than 50,000 PCBoard licenses by 1995.

The last full release of PCBoard was version 15.3 in September 1996. It never really caught on and most systems that were online after 1997 continued to use the previous 15.2x versions.

On July 29, 1996, Clark Technologies, a division of CDC, announced the availability of source code and OEM licenses for the PCBoard BBS software.

The final release was 15.4 beta, which had a one-month trial period. Later, the lead software engineer from CDC released information on how to bypass the trial period timeout; the timeout had been inserted as a reminder and had not been intended to permanently disable the software.

July 1997, CDC went bankrupt and closed its offices without prior warning, leaving a great number of upset customers behind. Customers were never notified by the company, and customers who had just purchased licences for the software were not notified, refunded or provided access to the software they had paid for.

Even after support by CDC stopped when the company went out of business, sysops continued to use PCBoard around the world. Help was available from many individuals who created tools and documentation for the PCBoard system.

Even though the company did not exist during the period leading up to the Year 2000 problem, PCBoard only had a few minor problems upon the arrival of 2000 (and 2001) and fixes were made available by several individuals.

PCBoard is still in use today by nostalgic BBS fans. There is a freeware FOSSIL driver called NetFoss which allows PCBoard to be accessible via telnet under Windows. There was also a DOS-based PCBoard add-on "PCB Internet Collection" which allowed telnet access by installing a (DOS-only) packet driver.

== Awards ==
PCBoard programming language / PPLC compiler

- 1994 - Dvorak Award for "Outstanding PC Telecommunications Technology"

BBS Software

- 1995 - PC Magazine Editors Choice Award (August 1995 Issue)
- 1995 - Dvorak Award for "Best OS/2-based BBS software"
- 1997 - CDC inducted into the Shareware Hall of Fame in 1997 by the SIAF board

== Features ==
- Packet switch support
- Full Internationalization of dates & code page
- FOSSIL support for virtually any intelligent serial card(/M code)
- File attachment to messages
- Multiple daily events
- Full support for 2-byte international character sets
- Built-in .QWK message packet support
- Jukebox & "slow" CD-ROM support
- Incoming fax support
- Carbon-copy list support
- Return receipt message support
- Caller-ID support
- ALIAS support by conference area
- RIPscrip support for remote callers
- PPL (PCBoard programming language compiler) (optional)
- Automatic 16550 UART recognition & support
- Intelligent & non-intelligent multi-port serial card support
- Full screen text editor
- ANSI graphics support
- Full color operation
- Thread reading of messages
- Supports up to 65,535 conference (message base) areas
- 36 file transfer protocols supported
- Supports 32,767 DOORS per conference
- Real-time 255 channel node chat (CB chat)
- Long message headers for all NetMail programs including Internet, Usenet & others.
- Local network logins for in-house e-mail support
- Direct connect support for in-house serial networks & PADS
- Communicates directly with OS/2 COMM drivers to allow large number of multiple nodes under OS/2
- Automatically detects OS/2 operation for time-slice control
- Full network support for any NetBIOS compatible network, including NetWare, LANtastic, 3-Com, Vines & more.
- Full remote DOS access for SysOp if desired
- True & complete multi-lingual language support

== Requirements ==
- IBM PC compatible
- Minimum 320k RAM
- DOS 3.1 or higher
- Modem to support remote dial-in, a Virtual Modem such as NetSerial, or the NetFoss telnet FOSSIL for Windows.

PCBoard/M

- Needs 80386 CPU or higher since code is written using 80386 instructions for maximum speed.

== PPE/PPL groups ==
Thousands of PPEs were developed and published, often available free of charge, by individuals or scene groups. A number of commercial PPEs were also developed, mostly under shareware licensing. A number of release groups who were specialized in PPE and other PCB/BBS tool developments were formed, such as the French group Aegis Corp, the Russian group Brutal PPE/PCE/PRO Coders (BPC) and the German groups Peanuts (PNS) and Paranoia (PNA).

Warez groups Such as PWA and DOD released several PPEs which were used by many sysops, including the PWA "NewScan" PPE, the PWA "Files-Reverse" PPE and the DOD "LARS Upload Processor".

The French group Aegis Corp distributed a PPE De-compiler (PPLX) written by Lone Runner, which allowed the de-compilation of PPE binaries back to human-readable PPL code. Lone Runner also wrote the Aegis PPL compiler, which produced smaller and faster code than Clark Development's original PPL compiler. Other tools for PPE developers followed. Another PPE De-compiler was PPLDecompiler (PPLD) written by CHiCKEN, a member of the "Swiss Coding Division" of the group Electronic Rats (EcR).

== PCBoard Metaworlds ==
Metaworlds was an attempt by CDC to establish a BBS-like environment on the Internet, basically a closed mailbox in HTML format online. Access to the content was only possible for registered users who had to authenticate themselves with username and password to access the system. Metaworlds supported the parallel operation with the standard ANSI based PCBoard BBS software and used Microsoft SQL Server as underlying database. A runtime-version of Microsoft SQL Server came with the Metaworlds software. CDC went out of business before Metaworlds was finished. Metaworlds was developed by CDC to make the transition to the Internet when the decline of the BBS became apparent.
