= Formosa BBS =

Bulletin board system software

Formosa BBS (or NSYSU Formosa BBS) was one of the earliest telnet-based Bulletin board systems (BBS) to have Chinese language capability. Work used from creating Formosa was combined with the open source Pirate BBS to create Eagle BBS from which the more user friendly Phoenix BBS was derived. The open source Phoenix BBS was the parent of the widely used Firebird BBS and Maple BBS.

== Taiwanese BBS software ==
=== Formosa BBS ===
Formosa BBS established in October 1992 by Professor Nien-Hsing Chen of the National Sun Yat-sen University (NSYSU). The objective was to provide a means for professors, universities and students to communicate.

=== Eagle BBS ===
In developing the Formosa BBS Chinese language interface Professor Chen used code from the open source Pirate BBS. The developed code was returned to the Pirate BBS developers who created Eagle BBS as an open source BBS with a Chinese language interface.

=== Phoenix BBS ===
Phoenix BBS was development of the Eagle BBS but incorporated a more user-friendly interface.

=== Firebird BBS ===
Firebird BBS is one of two main telnet-based Bulletin board systems developed in Taiwan. It is also gained popularity in mainland China and was adopted by most sites there. Several derived BBS systems are based on its source code. Some popular sites like SMTH BBS and HKiBBS are using the derived system of the Firebird.

=== Maple BBS ===
Maple BBS is one of two main telnet-based Bulletin board systems developed in Taiwan, the other being Firebird BBS. In Taiwan most BBS adopted Maple or its descendants in preference to Firebird BBS. Several BBS systems are based on its source code. In Taiwan Maple BBS and its descendants generally gained market share from FireBird BBS.

== See also ==
- Chinese input methods for computers
