= Binkp =

Computer network protocol

Binkp is a protocol for transferring FidoNet or WWIVNet mail over reliable connections. It is typically used to deliver mail over the internet, instead of point-to-point connections between modems.

== Application ==
Historically, FidoNet traffic was transferred mainly over serial (RS-232) modem connections which might not have an error correction layer. These dial-up-oriented protocols for transferring FidoNet traffic like EMSI or ZMODEM had to implement error-recovery. When the members of FidoNet started to use TCP/IP to transfer FidoNet traffic, this error-recovery overhead became unnecessary. Assuming that the connection is reliable makes it possible to eliminate error-checking and unnecessary synchronization steps, achieving both ease of implementation and improved performance. The major advantage of binkp vs EMSI and ZMODEM is achieved over connections with large delays and low bandwidth.

IANA (Internet Assigned Numbers Authority) has registered the port number 24554 for binkp when used over TCP/IP connections.

== History ==
- In 1996, Dima Maloff released the first draft of the protocol specification and the first mailer, binkd, that supported the new protocol.
- In 1997, Argus mailer began to support the binkp protocol.
- In 1999, Dima Maloff, Nick Soveiko and Maxim Masiutin submitted the protocol specification to the Fidonet Technical Standards Committee (FTSC), which published the document as Fidonet Standards Proposal (FSP-1011).
- In 2005, FTSC assigned the Fidonet Technical Standard (FTS) status to the binkp protocol, and split the specification into four separate documents: Binkp/1.0 Protocol specification (FTS-1026), Binkp/1.0 optional protocol extension CRAM (FTS-1027), Binkp protocol extension Non-reliable Mode (FTS-1028), and Binkp optional protocol extension Dataframe Compression (FTS-1029).
- On October 2, 2015, WWIV BBS's WWIVnet implemented a binkp backbone for its network.
