= ProTERM =

ProTERM is a terminal emulator and modem program for the Apple II and Macintosh lines of personal computers, published by Intrec Software. Most popular in the late 1980s and 1990s, it was most commonly used for calling bulletin board systems (BBSes) via a computer's modem, experienced users could also Telnet into Unix server and shell account thereon and FTP and tunneling to various destinations therefrom, and once logged into a Unix shell account, other forms of telecom all across the pre-Web Internet; via VT100 terminal emulator or ANSI art, this later ushered in Graphics to the scene.

The macro Language automated a lot of this process and the ProTERM user could code macros to log in and perform Unix functions in Bash or Bourne shell making this a very powerful terminal emulator, capable of manipulating mainframes and "hacking" into the heart of the internet at low and high levels.

ProTERM was rich in features such as an extensive "scrollback" buffer limited only by the computer's memory, an optional mouse-based interface in the Apple II version (standard on the Mac), an easy-to-use and very powerful text editor, auto learning macros, and a variety of terminal emulations such as VT100, ANSI and the powerful but proprietary "ProTERM Special Emulation" (also referred to as: PSE or PTSE) which used Apple's semi graphical MouseText character set. Supported file transfer protocols ranged from Kermit and Xmodem to Ymodem (Batch, 4K and G) and Zmodem (Batch Selections).

One feature of ProTERM Mac was the C-like scripting or macro language embedded inside ProTERM, allowing users to code and run ProTERM automatically. ProTERM could also be programmed to log in and execute command-line interface commands on the host machine, effectively controlling it remotely.

The latest published versions of ProTERM were v3.1 for the Apple II and v1.5 for the Macintosh. On January 3, 2009, the most recent Apple II version, 3.1, was relicensed as freeware and is now available for download.
