= Diversi-Dial =

Online chat server

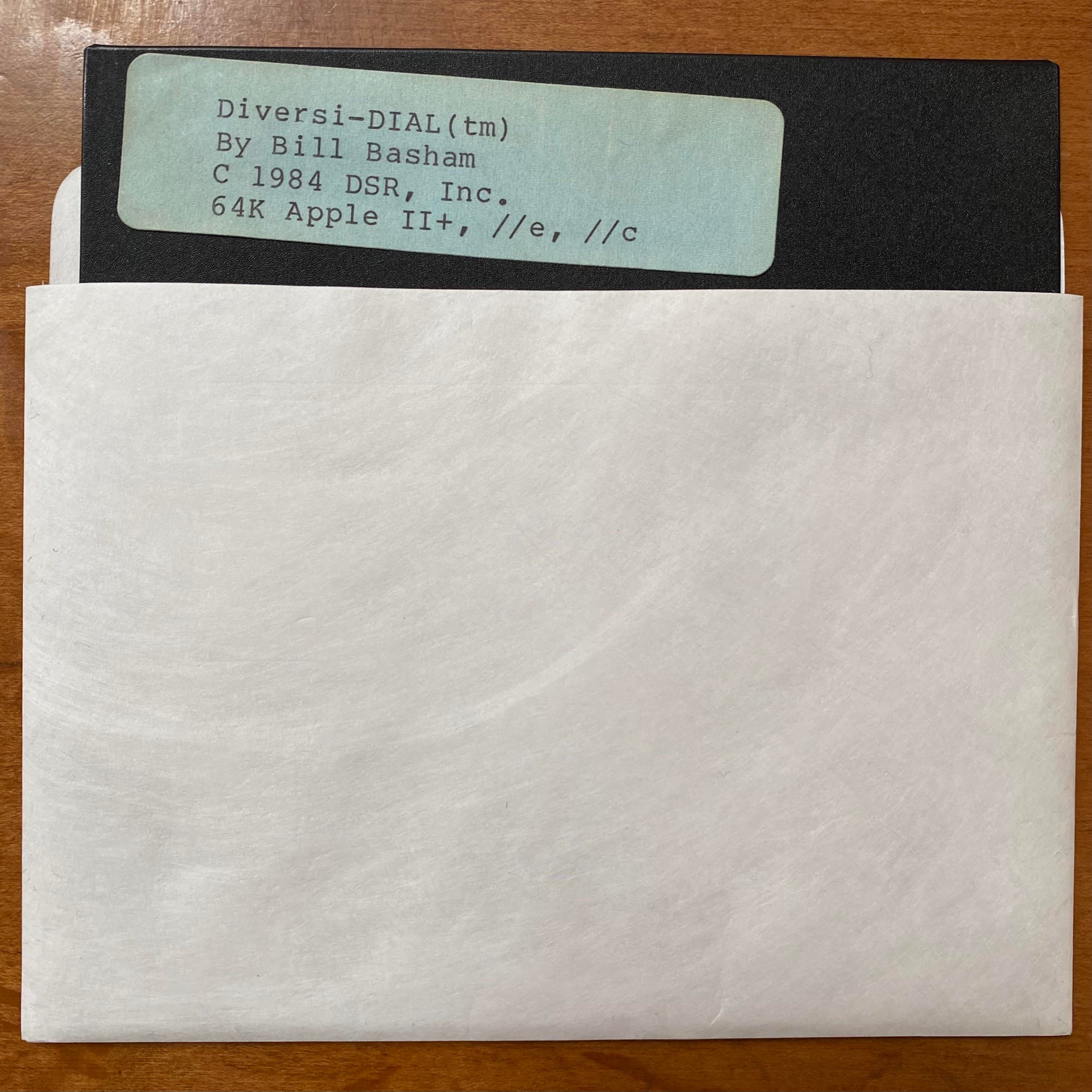
Apple II Diversi-DIAL installation disk

Diversi-Dial, or D-Dial was an online chat server that was popular during the mid-1980s. It was a specialized type of bulletin board system that allowed all callers to send lines of text to each other in real-time, often operating at 300 baud. In some ways, it was a sociological forerunner to IRC, and was a cheap, local alternative to CompuServe chat, which was expensive and billed by the minute. At its peak, at least 35 major DDial systems existed across the United States, many of them in large cities. During the evening when telephone rates were low, the biggest DDial systems would link together using Telenet or PC Pursuit connections, forming regional chat networks.

== History ==
Diversi-Dial was written by Bill Basham, a computer hobbyist who ran a company known as Diversified Software Research in Farmington Hills, Michigan. The software was written while he was a resident of Rockford, Illinois. Bill Basham ran a copy of the system himself in Rockford at the time. Kim Kirkpatrick, "Hubcap" also in Rockford, ran DDial#2 and a lot of early testing was done between Bill and Kim. Another early Rockford site was owned by Dale Wishop (GOD) named "Heaven and Hell - The World that GOD Rulz Over!". The phone company had to run miles of new cable just to accommodate the additional phone lines. When "Heaven and Hell" shutdown, Dale sold some of his 1200 baud Applecat modems to Scott and Terri Johnson (Megabucks and Spender), and DDial #12 “Spenderz Never Inn” started up in its place, running on two Apple //e computers and 12 phone lines. All of Bill's software followed the same naming scheme as "Diversi-[something]".

== Organization ==
Customers typically paid the local D-Dial owner a flat rate of about $5 to $20 per month. Open access to anonymous visitors (called nons, r0s, JAMFs, twits, or m0es) was an effective hook to draw in paid registrations. Nons typically had a five-minute connect time limit unless they were "validated" by an assistant sysop, and were shut out of the system during peak usage hours.

A typical D-Dial system ran on a single Apple //e computer utilizing all seven expansion slots. The program was transferred to cassette then loaded through the Apple //e's cassette port so as not to take up an expansion slot with a disk drive. Some systems had more than one Apple //e, and would link them together with an Interface II card in each Apple taking up a slot (usually slot 7) creating a small cluster with 6 telephone lines per computer, with the remaining single slot for the Interface II card for the local link.

In 1989, a DDial-like clone, Synergy Teleconferencing System AKA STS was developed for the IBM PC, but by this time it was outpaced by alternatives like GEnie. By the mid-1990s, DDials had been bypassed by the Internet and IRC, although Chicago's God's Country, kept an incredibly loyal following between 1985–87 and 1989–1998. Many of its users are still close to this day.

The original STS #12, The Jungle is back online and linked to Magviz as well as ENTChat.

Many client software programs existed for BBS connections back then, but one in particular for the Commodore 64 was optimized just for DDial, call Eagleterm 6a. Written by Jungle Jim (Jj), aka Jim Sanders, and released as freeware and saw widespread use among Ddialers. EagleTerm6a took full advantage of Commodore 64 pulse dial modem technology, heavily optimized to find the max pulse speed of the user's local phone connection, and rapid fire re-dial back in to beat the other callers when reconnecting, easily beating the newer tone dial modems just coming to market. During peak times, the DDial system was jam packed with callers far exceeding the number of available lines, and a super fast dialer was a plus. Later versions of Eagleterm6a were protected against reverse engineering (not de-compilable using unBlitz.)

== Major DDials ==
One DDial owner went on to become the founder and CEO of Honesty.com, the first web-based third-party Internet application corporation, focused on E-Commerce sites such as eBay, Amazon.com, and Yahoo! Auctions, by utilizing the knowledge gleaned from having run a social and community based computer system for a decade prior to initial popularity of the Web.

Point Zer0 was the other long-term Chicago-area Ddial, along with Jokertown. Other Chicago-area Ddials of Note included God's Country, Kaleidoscope, General Modem (DDial #13), Tangled Web, Twilight Zone, Spinnaker's Pub, The Bunker (DDial #4), Cloud Nine (DDial #38), Black Magic and others. At one period of time, the Chicago area hosted over 10 DDial or clone systems, possibly due to its relative proximity to the Rockford origins of Basham's DD #1.

ENTchat, an Internet-based DDial look-alike, was somewhat active in the mid- to late 1990s but also went offline.

In 2006, Pete Bartusek brought The Late Night BBS online, utilizing the original DDial software running on an Apple IIe, but was accessible from the Internet via telnet. The system provided an authentic 1980s ddial experience, including the traditional 300 bit/s connection speed across a bank of analog phone lines setup in a vintage modem pool and phone PBX.

As of 2025, there are at least three known DDial stations in operation:

- The Savage Frontier, DDial Station #28, has been modified to run under emulation and is therefore Internet accessible. This system served the Philadelphia metropolitan area in the 1980s and 1990s, at times under other names.
- RMAC (aka Rover's Multiuser Active Conference), DDial Station #34, runs on original Apple IIe hardware with modems and has been constructed in an Internet-accessible manner. This system served the Dallas / Fort Worth metroplex in the late 1980s. Today, the system uses authentic DDial software with TASC/Paradise mods, and can be reached via telnet at rmac.d-dial.com.
- Late Night Diversi-Dial went offline for a number of years but returned in 2025 utilizing emulation software RetroDial, that provided a similar visual experience, while working to include the original Apple II hardware.

A system with the look and feel of Diversi-Dial is online at ddial.com EntChat, The Jungle STS, and other systems from the past are connected to Magviz, a web-based system based on Diversi-Dial Software. Many users from that era are online, and there are regularly scheduled meetups that are like the large links of old without the

huge phone bills. 

Retro-Dial, a Linux-based chat server with the look and feel of D-Dial, currently has multiple stations in operation which are usually linked with each other as well as The Savage Frontier. The home station for Retro-Dial can be reached via telnet at carriersync.com.

In late June, 2013, several members of Rockford, IL area D-Dials held a spontaneous reunion online, connected to each other via RMAC D-Dial #34.
