= Waffle (BBS software) =

BBS software

Waffle is a bulletin-board system created by Tom Dell for the Dark Side of the Moon BBS which ran under DOS and later UNIX. The software was unique among DOS BBS software in many ways, including the fact that all of the configuration files were in readable text files, and that it fully supported Usenet and UUCP on the DOS platform.

A Usenet news group named comp.bbs.waffle was created for discussion of the Waffle BBS System.

Waffle was first released in 1989. The last version seems to be v1.65. There was a beta version of 1.66 on the main site, but it was never released.

It was possible to link Waffle (under DOS) to Fidonet and WWIV using external gateway utilities.
