= QuickBBS =

- Original author: Adam Hudson
- Developer: (and Phil Becker)
- Release: 1986; 40 years ago BBS Sites that ran on QBBS (QuickBBS) Texas: AES (Austin Software Exchange) ran for over 10 years - Site offered Files, Message Board, Doors, Games, multi-user chat rooms. First in area to offer ISDN services.
- Stable release: 2.90 / January 4, 1999; 27 years ago
- Operating system: MS-DOS
- Type: Bulletin board system
- License: Proprietary
- Website: (defunct)

QuickBBS (QBBS) was a bulletin board system (BBS) application first introduced for MS-DOS by Adam Hudson.

== Features ==
- Messaging
- Multi-user login
- Doors
- Games
- File transfer
- Multi-user interaction
- Low memory overhead
- Written in Borland Turbo Pascal

== Other BBS Software Programs ==
- RBBS-PC
- FidoBBS / FidoNET
