= RBBS-PC =

- Developer(s): Russell Lane, Tom Mack, Ken Goosens, others
- Initial release: June 21, 1981; 43 years ago
- Written in: BASIC
- Operating system: MS-DOS
- Type: Bulletin board system
- License: freeware, open source

RBBS-PC (acronym for Remote Bulletin Board System for the Personal Computer) was a freeware, open-source BBS software program. It was written entirely in BASIC by a large team of people, starting with Russell Lane and then later enhanced by Tom Mack, Ken Goosens and others.

It supported messaging conferences, questionnaires, doors (through the DORINFO1.DEF dropfile), file sharing and much more.

== History ==
In 1982, Larry Jordan of the Capital PC Users Group started modifying some existing BBS software that had been ported from CP/M by Russell Lane. The first major release of this effort, RBBS-PC CPC09, in May 1983 was written in interpreted BASIC and included the Xmodem file transfer protocol added by Jordan. In June 1983, Jordan turned over maintenance and enhancements to Tom Mack and Ken Goosens. The first release under Mack, version 10.0, was released July 4, 1983. New versions and features were released steadily throughout the rest of the 1980s. The final complete version, 17.4, was released June 21, 1992.

Since version 17.4 at least four other code paths have developed. Some work has been done to unify the code paths and to develop version 18.0. Dan Drinnons CDOR Mods and Mapleleaf versions were further enhanced by beta testers Mike Moore and Bob Manapeli using Ken Goosens LineBled program to manipulate the source code to endless variations of the program.

== License ==
RBBS-PC was not in public domain, but copyrighted and released under a limited license. The license allowed free distribution of both source code and binary in non-modified form. The documentation from an early 1984 CPC12.1 release lists the following conditions:

- RBBS-PC CPC12 is not distributed in modified form,
- No fee or other consideration is charged, and
- Reference to the authors is retained.

In the final 17.4 release from 1992 the license conditions were almost identical:

- You may NOT distribute RBBS-PC in modified form.
- You may NOT charge a fee for RBBS-PC itself, and
- You MUST retain all references to the copyright and authors.

While the modified form distribution was not allowed, the documentation encouraged to publish and share modifications (bug fixes, new features) as patch files against the original source code. RBBS-PC had its own .MRG file format and tool for patching.

== Philosophy ==
From the beginning of RBBS-PC's development, the authors of the software had two goals as stated in the RBBS-PC documentation:

- To show what could be done with the BASIC language and that "real programmers can/do program in BASIC."
- To open a new medium of communication where anyone with a personal computer has the ability to communicate freely. This idea was summarized as "Users helping users for free to help the free exchange of information."
