= Boardwatch =

Magazine covering BBS systems

Boardwatch Magazine's August 2000 issue

Boardwatch Magazine, informally known as Boardwatch, was initially published and edited by Jack Rickard. Founded in 1987, it began as a publication for the online Bulletin Board Systems of the 1980s and 1990s and ultimately evolved into a trade magazine for the Internet service provider (ISP) industry in the late 1990s. The magazine was based in Lakewood, Colorado, and was published monthly.

The magazine included advertisements for BBSes, BBS software and hardware, and editorials about the BBS scene.

The founder and original editor of Boardwatch was Jack Rickard, who wrote editorials about many of the ISP industry's major players. Boardwatch spawned an ISP industry tradeshow, ISPcon, and published a yearly Directory of Internet Service Providers. In 1998, Rickard sold a majority interest in Boardwatch and its related products to an East Coast multimedia company, which was then acquired by Penton Media in 1999 and moved to another ventures, notably EVTV, an online/video magazine of electric car conversions. Rickard died August 31, 2020, aged 65.

In 2000, the Boardwatch Magazine staff published a bi-monthly magazine called CLEC Magazine for competitive local exchange carriers (CLECs), small telecom startups that used competitive FCC rulings to resell Baby Bell communication infrastructure. The magazine's March–April 2000 issue included a state-by-state CLEC listing similar to the ISP directory Boardwatch published. Penton produced a CLECexpo trade show in conjunction with the magazine. Penton also produced one ASPcon trade show for application service providers (ASPs), the forerunners to today's infrastructure as a service (IaaS) providers like Salesforce.com and cloud computing and storage companies.

Penton Media launched ISPworld, an Internet portal website for ISPs, in 2001. The magazine ceased publication in 2002 and its assets were later purchased by online telecom publication Light Reading. ISPcon continued until the last event in November 2008.

== Writers and staff ==
- Jack Rickard (publisher, 1987–1999)
- David Hakala (editor at fault, 1991–1995)
- Steve Clark (editor in chief, 1997)
- Bill McCarthy (managing editor, editor in chief, 1997–2001)
- Todd Erickson (associate editor, managing editor, 1997–2002)
- David Kopf (editorial director, 2001–2002)
- Steve Stroh (freelance writer and columnist)
- John C. Dvorak (freelance writer and columnist)
- Jeffrey Carl (freelance writer and columnist)
- Christopher Knight (freelance writer and columnist)(author)
- Bob Rankin (freelance writer and columnist)(author)
- Gary Funk (technical director, 1991–1999)
- Jason Remillard (freelance writer)
- Brett Glass (cybersecurity columnist)
- Randy Goldner (publisher, 2000-2002)
