= Door (bulletin board system) =

Interface between an external application and a BBS

In a bulletin board system (BBS), a door is an interface between the BBS software and an external application. The term is also used to refer to the external application, a computer program that runs outside of the main bulletin board program. Sometimes called external programs, doors are the most common way to add games, utilities, and other extensions to BBSes. Because BBSes typically depended on the telephone system, BBSes and door programs tended to be local in nature, unlike Internet games and applications.

From the 1990s on, most BBS software had the capability to "drop to" doors. Several standards were developed for passing connection and user information to doors; this was usually done with "dropfiles", small binary or text files dropped into known locations in the BBS's file system. Most doors were responsible for operating the serial port or other communications device directly until returning control to the BBS. Later development of FOSSIL drivers have allowed both BBSes and their doors to communicate without being responsible for direct operation of the communications hardware.

== Door games ==
A major use of doors is for door games: computer games played on the BBS. These games included strategy games such as TradeWars 2002, Food Fight!, Solar Realms Elite, Space Dynasty, Usurper, and Barren Realms Elite. There were also role-playing games (RPG), often derived from earlier email-based games—examples include Seth Robinson's Legend of the Red Dragon, popular dystopian RPG: Operation: Overkill, and Mutants!. Another door game, Pyroto Mountain, involved trivia questions. BBSes often published high scores, encouraging players to beat others.

InterBBS leagues allowed users of different BBSes to compete against each other in the same game. A modern version of this known as BBSlink exists allowing sysops to offer door games on their BBS which are hosted on a remote server, thereby increasing the user base of the game.

== Other applications ==
While many of the most popular and memorable BBS doors have been games, numerous doors had non-entertainment applications such as user polls or the time bank, permitting users to time-shift their rationed BBS use. Frequently they act as a front-end to themed databases on subject such as astrology, numerology and fortune-telling, recipes, weather prediction, personal ads (sometimes with additional match-making functionality), classified ads and "for sale" listings (sometimes permitting auctions), BBS lists, and parting comments from the most recent BBS callers.
