= Sysop =

Short-hand for user with administrative permissions on a multi-user system

A sysop (/ˈsɪs.ɒp/ SIS-op; an abbreviation of system operator, and sometimes further abbreviated to just op) is an administrator of a multi-user computer system, such as a bulletin board system (BBS) or an online virtual community. The phrase may also be used to refer to administrators of other Internet-based network services. Sysops typically do not earn money, but donate their activity to the community.

Co-sysops are users who may be granted certain admin privileges on a BBS. Generally, they help validate users and monitor discussion forums. Some co-sysops serve as file clerks, reviewing, describing, and publishing newly uploaded files into appropriate download directories.

Historically, the term system operator applied to operators of any computer system, especially a mainframe computer. In general, a sysop is a person who oversees the operation of a server, typically in a large computer system. Usage of the term became popular in the late 1980s and 1990s, originally in reference to BBS operators. A person with equivalent functions on a network host or server is typically called a sysadmin, short for system administrator.

Because such duties were often shared with that of the sysadmin prior to the advent of the World Wide Web, the term sysop is often used more generally to refer to an administrator or moderator, such as a forum administrator. Hence, the term sysadmin is technically used to distinguish the professional position of a network operator.

== See also ==
- IRCop
- Internet slang
- Jargon
- Jargon File
- Network administrator
- Online service provider
- Virtual community
