= Qmodem =

Comms and terminal emulator DOS software

- Original author: John Friel III
- Developers: Mustang Software (starting in 1991)
- Release: 1984; 42 years ago
- Operating system: MS-DOS
- Type: telecommunications program, terminal emulator
- License: shareware

Qmodem was an MS-DOS shareware telecommunications program and terminal emulator. Qmodem was widely used to access bulletin boards in the 1980s and was well respected in the Bulletin Board System (BBS) community. Qmodem was also known as Qmodem SST and Qmodem Pro.

== Qmodem ==
Qmodem was developed by John Friel III in 1984 and sold as shareware through a company called The Forbin Project. Qmodem gained in popularity very quickly because it was much faster and had many new features compared to PC-Talk, the dominant shareware IBM PC communications program of that time.

Originally developed in Borland Turbo Pascal, the application originally supported the XMODEM protocol, gradually added support for other protocols such as the popular ZMODEM protocol and CompuServe-specific protocols such as CIS-B and CIS-B+. Qmodem evolved to include features such as the ability to host a simple Bulletin Board System. The application was sold to Mustang Software in 1991 and in 1992 version 5 of the program was released. The final version for MS-DOS was 5.01.

=== Awards ===
- 1992 John Friel received the Dvorak Award for his development of Qmodem.
- 1994 Mustang Software Incorporated received the Dvorak Award for QmodemPro for Windows.

=== Features ===
Qmodem supported the following file transfer protocols (per version 4.6 user manual):

- ASCII (plain text transfer)
- XMODEM-Checksum (128 byte block with 8-bit checksum)
- XMODEM-Relaxed (XMODEM-Checksum with relaxed error timing)
- XMODEM-CRC (128 byte block with 16-bit CRC)
- XMODEM-1K (1024 byte block with 16-bit CRC)
- YMODEM-Batch
- ZMODEM-Batch
- XMODEM-1K/G (requires a MNP compatible error-correcting modem)
- YMODEM/G-Batch (requires a MNP compatible error-correcting modem)
- Kermit (via external program)
- Puma (via external program)

== Qmodem Pro ==
Qmodem Pro was a paid commercial successor of Qmodem, by Mustang Software, announced on November 15, 1993. The final version for MS-DOS was 1.52.

Later, Qmodem Pro for Windows was released, and its final version was 1.11c. Later, a version for Windows 95 was released, and the final version being QmodemPro 2.1 for Windows 95 and Windows NT which was released July 7, 1997.

QmodemPro continued to be sold by Mustang Software through 2000 when the rights to it were purchased by Quintus Corporation.

== Qodem ==
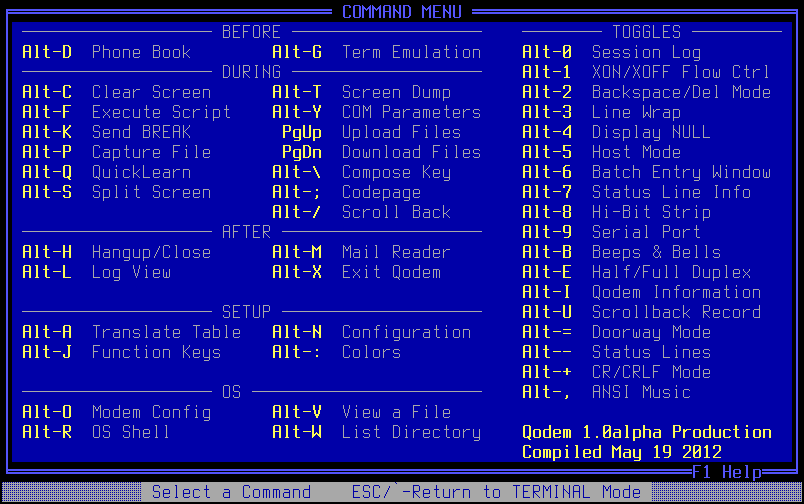
Screen from Qodem

An independent free software re-implementation of Qmodem for Unix-like systems called Qodem started development in 2003. Qodem is in the public domain and has features common to modern communications programs, such as Unicode display, and support for the telnet and ssh network protocols. It has also been ported to Microsoft Windows, and compatible with Windows 95 and later versions of Windows. It can be compiled with Borland C++ 5.02 or Microsoft Visual C++ 6.0.

== See also ==
- List of BBS software
- List of terminal emulators
- Comparison of file transfer protocols#Serial protocols
