= McBBS =

- Developer(s): DMCS Technologies
- Stable release: 5.5.3 / October 1999
- Preview release: 5.5.3 demo / May 2000
- Operating system: Commodore 64, DOS
- Type: Bulletin board system
- License: Proprietary
- Website: N/A

McBBS was a Bulletin Board System developed by Derek E. McDonald and distributed by DMCS Technologies between October 30, 1989, and May 30, 2000, and operated over 18 versions.

== History ==
McBBS started out as a project for the then High School student Derek McDonald, then attending Charles P. Allen High School in Bedford, Nova Scotia, Canada. As an aspiring young programmer, and unhappy with the software available to him at the time, he set out to prove he could build his own stable computer communications system as a personal project.

Heavily influenced by the works of Ken Spence and his Spence XP BBS system of which there were two versions written in 1985 and 1987 respectively, as well as Ed Parry's EBBS and Clarke Development's PCBoard, the McBBS software was originally developed for the Commodore 64 computer but was ported over to the DOS platform in 1992 (starting with McBBS v3.0) where it remained until the project was officially ended in May 2000. The software was written entirely in the BASIC computer language, but starting with version 3.1 in 1992 it was compiled from BASIC into 8086 executable code for DOS.

The program featured all the standard functions of a BBS of the time including file transfers in several competing protocols (XMODEM, YMODEM, YMODEM-G, ZMODEM) provided with the program or as third-party software; they connected externally to the main program itself. It also featured message boards and a primitive form of what we now call E-mail. The program was also capable of producing simple graphics & text using both the ASCII, PETSCII, and the ANSI escape code character sets and color codes.

McBBS also had the advanced and unique feature of a primitive sound broadcasting system allowing the BBS to program the remote computer's beeper speaker using what was essentially an extension of the ANSI Escape Code sequences used exclusively by McBBS. The net result, when used with the appropriate translation software (also supplied by McDonald and company), was audible, if low-resolution music; a demonstration given by McDonald himself once showed the BBS playing The Rolling Stone's "You Can't Always Get What You Want", and the William Tell Overture, coded using a simple text editor.

As far as speed goes, McBBS was one of the first to adopt what was (then) high speed modems exceeding 14400 bit/s, the program itself was small and efficiently written, allowing it great speed. The program was also Y2K-compliant and survived the century changeover. The last version "McBBS v5.5 rev.3" was featured on the Alliance CD as the multimedia component in a last effort to promote the program when Emperor Multimedia Corporation took over the assets of DMCS Technologies when the companies merged.

McBBS was marketed exclusively to operators and users of BBS systems over those same BBS public message forums. From time to time advertisements were posted over various BBS networks promoting its virtues. Since McBBS seemed to be a robust product and yet had a small footprint on the computer's memory and disc this feature was heavily exploited. In the early Commodore days the slogan was, "McBBS; The Little BBS That Could", a spoof off the Children's book The Little Engine That Could. In the PC years the slogan was, "Sometimes Big Things Come In Small Packages"; this second campaign proving to be the most successful. When networking was introduced the ad gleefully played on the product name saying, "You can now do more than just order fries and burgers with it!", clearly answering the critics who teased the product's name by spoofing McDonald's restaurants.

The Market for the old-style BBS software was eroded by the arrival of the Internet and the Windows GUI operating systems during the late 1990s, and although McBBS had primitive networking capabilities via the FidoNet, and its own proprietary McNET, it was not enough to compete with the internet E-mailing systems, nor could McDonald program a new version fast enough to compete with the arrival of the GUI operating systems. McBBS was terminated a short time after.

For sometime the official history of McBBS was available at the Emperor Multimedia website. Emperor Multimedia has since moved on to invest in the entertainment industry, specializing in Multimedia, with assets in internet applications, e-books, databases and web design. McDonald (with Emperor Multimedia) later releases of Polishing of Metal, and the Diskery music distribution firm, would once again see him and his company with commercial success.

A scripting language known as "Viking", as well as a remote communications terminal called Comterm were also developed for McBBS as add-ons for the system; Comterm going on to be a product in its own right that has since been discontinued also.

== Statistics ==
McBBS's sold for $40 U.S. originally on the Commodore 64 and the later 5.x set, all versions in between were free. It is unknown how many copies of McBBS were sold, but it is known that installations existed in Asia, North America and Europe. The largest concentration of McBBS installations was in the Mid-West USA and Eastern Canada.

On August 12, 2007, the UNESCO (a division of the United Nations) "Great Library of Alexandria" (Bibliotheca Alexandrina) confirmed and accepted receipt of a shipment that would be archived on its shelves. The shipment was sent from Derek McDonald himself, included with this shipment was a single copy of the last version of McBBS released thus far.

The version nomenclature is as follows:

v0.95, v1.0 - Never published.

v1.1, 1.2, 1.5, 2.0, 2.5, 2.6 - Released for Commodore 64/128.

Starting with v2.0 all programs were "modular" meaning the components were controlled by a central program and swapped in and out of memory as needed. 2.0 was also the first to feature the Hayes modem instruction set.

v3.0, 3.1, 3.1C, 3.5, 4.0, 5.0, 5.1, 5.1A, 5.5, 5.5.1, 5.5.2, 5.5.3 - All published for IBM-PC.

v3.1C was the first compiled into direct executable code.

4.0 was the first to feature networking.

5.1A was the first "high speed" modem version that could exceed 9600 bit/s using a supplied driver written in compiled Pascal language. It also had the file transfer protocols supplied with it.

5.5 had the high speed routines within the program itself, it also featured the integrated terminal program and scripting language.
