= PC Tools =

PC Tools may refer to:

- PC Tools (company), a security software company, best known for Spyware Doctor
- PC Tools (magazine), a UK-based computer magazine
- PC Tools (software), a collection of software utilities for MS-DOS and Windows 3.x
