= Commo =

Telecommunications software program

Commo is a telecommunications program which was written and maintained from 1989 to 1998 by Fred P. Brucker. It was a macro-driven package and could be customized by the user. The program, written in optimized assembly language and distributed as shareware, was small and fast.

The macro language used by Commo was simple, with assembly language-like statements surrounded by curly braces. It offered the ability to control most aspects of the terminal. For instance, the following macro would reconfigure the Alt-X key to display a dialog box, allowing the user to confirm before exiting the program:

{:alx} {info-qs0 Really exit?}

{ifco ,alxn} {exit} {:alxn} {}

The program's macro and configuration files were free-form text which could be edited with any text editor. This led to popularity among those who wanted to be able to configure the program.

Fred Brucker actively provided support for screen readers to work with COMMO, which made it a popular program for the visually impaired. The Powermacros add-on made COMMO one of the first Trade Wars 2002 'helper' programs. MacroBBS was a Bulletin board system written entirely out of COMMO macros.

Mr. Brucker released the last version of COMMO on 25 December 1998.

== See also ==
- Telix
- Qmodem
- Terminate (software)
- Kermit
- Minicom
- ProComm Plus
