= V36 =

V36 may refer to:

- Fokker V.36, a German fighter aircraft
- ITU-T V.36, a wideband modem standard
- Nissan Skyline (V36), an automobile
