= Carbon Copy (software) =

Remote control software for PCs

Carbon Copy was "a remote control/communications program" with for-its-day advanced features for remote screen sharing, background file transfer, and "movable chat windows".

== Overview ==
The New York Times described it thus: "you can sit at the console of either machine and call up the programs and files stored on the other". Computerworld called it "a package that mirrors every action a user takes on two connected PCs".

Part of its user base was acquired via inclusion as bonus software for a modem that could communicate at "300, 1200 and 2400 baud."

Carbon Copy's vendor, Meridian Technology, was acquired by Microcom in early 1988, and accepted tax credits to move software duplication and packaging of Carbon Copy to Puerto Rico. Meridian had a British subsidiary, also acquired by Microcom.

== History ==
Computerworld covered the flow of features and newer releases: 3.0 (1986), 1987, 1989. By 1991, although Version 5.2.2 was still actively marketed, Version 6.0 was released to coincide with the release of MS-DOS 5.0.

By 1994, DOS versions topped out at 6.0, and the 2.0 version of Carbon Copy Plus for Windows was available. A version for the Macintosh platform was also available, dubbed "Carbon Copy for the Mac".

== See also ==
- BLAST (protocol)
- Kermit (protocol)
