= CompuCom SpeedModem =

Early high speed modem

The CompuCom SpeedModem was an early high speed modem that implemented a proprietary 9600 bit/s protocol known as the CompuCom Speed Protocol (CSP). Their modems were much less expensive than competing high-speed models, and were well known for a time. The introduction of low-cost standards-based v.32bis modems made the SpeedModem disappear with surprising speed.

Two versions of the SpeedModem were released in 1991, the Champ with an introductory price of $169, and Combo at $279 which added 9,600 bit/s Group III fax support. The modem supported MNP5 data compression and their own format, CSP-3, which they claimed was as effective as v.42bis. For connections to other modems, the SpeedModem supported V.22bis for 2400 bit/s support (as well as 1200 and 300 bit/s support).

For reasons that are not recorded in the historical record, the SpeedModem had problems connecting over packet switching networks, which made commercial online service connections problematic. Throughout, the very low price led to many concerns about quality and whether or not it was worth buying a non-standard modem.

The SpeedModems came to market shortly before the first v.32bis modems, which ran at 14,400 bit/s. These were initially much more expensive, but the SupraFAXModem 14400 was released in January 1992 at $399, offering even higher performance, complete compatibility with all other modems, and adding a fax capability as well. When Supra's exclusivity over the internal Rockwell International chipset ended, the market was soon flooded with even lower-cost models. CompuCom responded by introducing faster 14.4 and 19.2 kbit/s CSP modems, but they were drowned out in a market flooded with v.32bis.

CompuCom responded with the CompuCom Storm, which added v.32 support, the high-end Challenger series with v.32bis, and finally the lower-cost CompuCom Star, with v.32bis. These had little or no price advantage compared to other standards-based modems, and little time in the market before CompuCom Communications went out of business.

One remaining vestige of the system is the "CSP" flag in the FidoNet nodelist file, which indicates the BBS system supports the CSP format.
