= X.PC =

X.PC is a deprecated communications protocol developed by McDonnell-Douglas for connecting a personal computer to its Tymnet packet-switched public data telecommunications network. It is a subset of X.25, a CCITT standard for packet-switched networks. It is a full-duplex, asynchronous and error-correcting network protocol that supports up to 15 simultaneous channels. It maintains automatic error correction during any communications session between two or more computers.

X.PC was originally developed to enable connections up to 9600 baud. Unlike MNP, a competing standard proposed by Microcom, X.PC was placed in the public domain for royalty-free usage. MNP, on the other hand, initially required a $2,500 licensing fee. Microcom battled X.PC for acceptance in the marketplace, and eventually released MNP 1 through 3 into the public domain to compete.

At the time, several modem manufacturers supported MNP in their products, Microcom and Racal-Vadic being major examples. Several companies announced support for X.PC, including Hayes, but none of the companies announcing support offered it in their modems. X.PC quickly disappeared, and Microcom would go on to release MNP 4 and 5 into the public domain as well.
