= Carbon copy (disambiguation) =

Carbon copy is a simple document copying technique.

Carbon Copy may also refer to:

- Carbon copy (e-mail), a header in e-mail
- Carbon Copy (film), a 1981 comedy film directed by Michael Schultz
- Carbon Copy (2016 film), a 2016 Canadian action drama film
- Carbon Copy (horse), a horse which participated at the Cox Plate
- Carbon Copy (software), an early remote control and file transfer software for DOS and Windows published by Microcom
- Carbon Copy, a "full name" for CC the cat
- Carbon Copy, an analog delay effect pedal by MXR
