= ASVD =

ASVD may refer to:

- ITU-T V.61, a standard for analog simultaneous voice and data
- Atherosclerosis or arteriosclerotic vascular disease, an artery disease
