= Microcom =

Modem hardware and software company

Microcom, Inc.
- Type: Telecommunications
- Founded: 1980; 46 years ago in Norwood, Massachusetts
- Founder: James M. Dow
- Defunct: 1997; 29 years ago
- Fate: Acquired by Compaq
- Products: Modems
- Website: microcom.com at the Wayback Machine (archived 1996-11-11)

Microcom, Inc., was a major modem vendor during the 1980s, although never as popular as the "big three", Hayes, USRobotics (USR) and Telebit. Nevertheless, Microcom holds an important place in modem history for introducing the MNP error-correction and compression protocols, which were widely used under license by most modem manufacturers in the 1990s. The company went public in 1987. Compaq purchased publicly outstanding shares of the company in 1997.

== History and products ==
Microcom was founded in 1980 by James M. Dow from Data General.

In the mid-1980s several companies introduced new modems with various "high-speed" features in order to differentiate themselves from the growing legion of Hayes 1200 bit/s clones that were flooding into the market. Developing such a protocol was not all that easy, and generally required a fairly powerful and expensive microcontroller to handle the modulation. For companies with limited resources, entering this market was difficult.

Microcom took another approach, addressing the feature gap not through higher speeds, but through additional software capabilities. They developed a series of protocols, known collectively as Microcom Networking Protocol (MNP), that implemented simple packet-based file transfer protocols suitable for implementation on very simple microcontrollers. The differences were primarily in how difficult the protocol was to implement, with MNP 1 being extremely simple allowing it to be implemented on many existing modems with no hardware changes, while MNP 4 offered much better throughput at the cost of increased memory needs, which modems typically had little of (40 bytes was common).

Microcom introduced their own modems starting with the AX/1200 and AX/2400 modems, which featured MNP 4 error correction in an otherwise standard 1200 bit/s Bell 212A/V.22 or 2400 bit/s V.22bis modem. When a Microcom modem was used by both ends of a connection, the connection was entirely error-free.

Microcom continued developing the MNP standards, and later introduced MNP 5, which compressed the data in the modem before sending it, thereby actually increasing the data rate while still being error-free. MNP 5 was introduced on the AX/1200c and AX/2400c, the "c" for "compression". MNP 1 through 5 were later handed to the ISO for standardization, and became widely available.

Microcom then developed the AX/9624c modem to answer the call to 9600 bit/s, introducing MNP 6. Competing companies also offered 9600 bit/s products, but these were all based on proprietary modulation schemes. Microcom employed a variation of V.29 modulation which is half-duplex 9600 bit/s. MNP 6 utilized the compression of MNP 5, and with the fast training capability of the Rockwell V.29 devices. the AX/9624c achieved full-duplex 9600 bit/s at a price lower than its competitors. Like other 9600 bit/s modems, it was required to have the same hardware on both ends of the link, however, the modem also supported V.22bis at 2400 bit/s.

Microcom introduced a new series of ever-faster modems, typically based on newly introduced standards. The first of these was the 9600 bit/s V.32-based QX/V32c, but the introduction of V.42bis compression system that easily outperformed MNP 5 led them to introduce the QX/4232, followed by the 14,400 bit/s QX/4232bis when the V.32bis standard was ratified. Microcom and Rockwell became partners on a number of ventures, including the creation of the MNP 10 and MNP 10EC protocols, and Microcom increasingly used Rockwell chipsets across their line.

The company also broadened its line into different price points, offering the DeskPorte series as their primary desktop modem, the OfficePorte which was similar but added fax capabilities, and the TravelPorte or TravelCard series of PC Card-based products for portable users. These all had the added benefit of allowing the user the option using the parallel port as a communications port, which offered a faster throughput - this was achieved by using a re-director software developed by Microcom.

Microcom also had a range of other products including the award-winning Carbon Copy remote control and file transfer software, LANlord desktop/PC management software, Microcom Bridge Router (MBR), a centralised dial pool system High Density Modem System (HDMS) which was used by service providers for the first deployments of dial-in ports for the early adopter internet and bulletin board users, and LANexpress, a corporate remote access solution.

== Command sets ==
In order to control these new features, Microcom introduced a series of new command switches prefixed with the backslash, \, while retaining the extended commands used in the Hayes Smartmodem 2400, prefixed by the ampersand, & for things like carrier detection and speed selection. As other companies increasingly used the MNP protocols, many chose to keep the original commands specified by Microcom, notably AT&T Paragon's chipsets which were fairly popular in the early 1990s. Hayes instead chose to introduced their own set with additional &-prefixed commands, USR an incompatible set of &-prefixed commands, and Telebit added to their already bewildering array of setup registers. It would be many years before the complete dominance of the Rockwell chipsets would re-standardize the market on the Hayes-based commands.

== Patent settlement ==
In 1993 Microcom settled a lawsuit against them by Spectrum Information Technologies via a consent decree that resulted in "a cross-licensing agreement for patents."
