= Chuck Forsberg =

American computer programmer

Charles Alton Forsberg
- Born: May 6, 1944; Wilmette, Illinois, US
- Died: September 24, 2015 (aged 71); Portland, Oregon, US
- Other name: Chuck Forsberg
- Education: University of Wisconsin (M.S.)
- Notable work: YMODEM, ZMODEM
- Engineering career
- Discipline: Computer engineering
- Employer: Tektronix
- Projects: Tektronix 4010
- Awards: Dvorak Award for Excellence in Telecommunications

Charles Alton "Chuck" Forsberg (May 6, 1944 – September 24, 2015) developed two data transmission protocols popular in the 1990s, for uploading and downloading files from dial-up bulletin board systems. He received a Dvorak Award for Excellence in Telecommunications in 1992 for developing ZMODEM. He was also the project engineer on the Tektronix 4010-series graphics terminals.

The widely adopted ZMODEM uses a sliding window protocol. Rather than wait for positive acknowledgment after each block is sent, it sends blocks in rapid succession and resends unacknowledged blocks later. By avoiding delays due to latency, the bandwidth usable for transmission more closely approached the bandwidth of the underlying link. ZMODEM could also resume interrupted transfers without retransmitting the already-received blocks. In addition to developing the protocol, Forsberg developed software for sending and receiving files using ZMODEM.

Forsberg then wrote a version, Zmodem G, which was for use over "guaranteed error free" communications lines, such as Ethernet or short serial-to-serial computer connections. This protocol waived the usual retransmission overhead, to send files as fast as possible.

Originally, he wrote a program for Unix called rbsb (receive batch / send batch) which used block 0 to transmit a file's name, and optionally date and time, since Ward Christensen designed XMODEM to start at block 1, leaving block 0 available. Christensen suggested Forsberg call his protocol YMODEM because it was "one better" than Xmodem. Forsberg created the program YAM, which in traditional Unix nomenclature stood for Yet Another Modem after "Modem.asm", the original version of Xmodem released by Christensen in the CP/M User's group in 1977.

Forsberg most recently resided in Portland, Oregon, prior to his death. He ran data transmission software company Omen Technology which he founded in 1984. Omen Technology published software tools such as ZComm (a terminal-based communications program that included the ZMODEM-90 file transfer protocol) and DSZ. He was an amateur radio operator (call sign WA7KGX) and a licensed aircraft pilot.

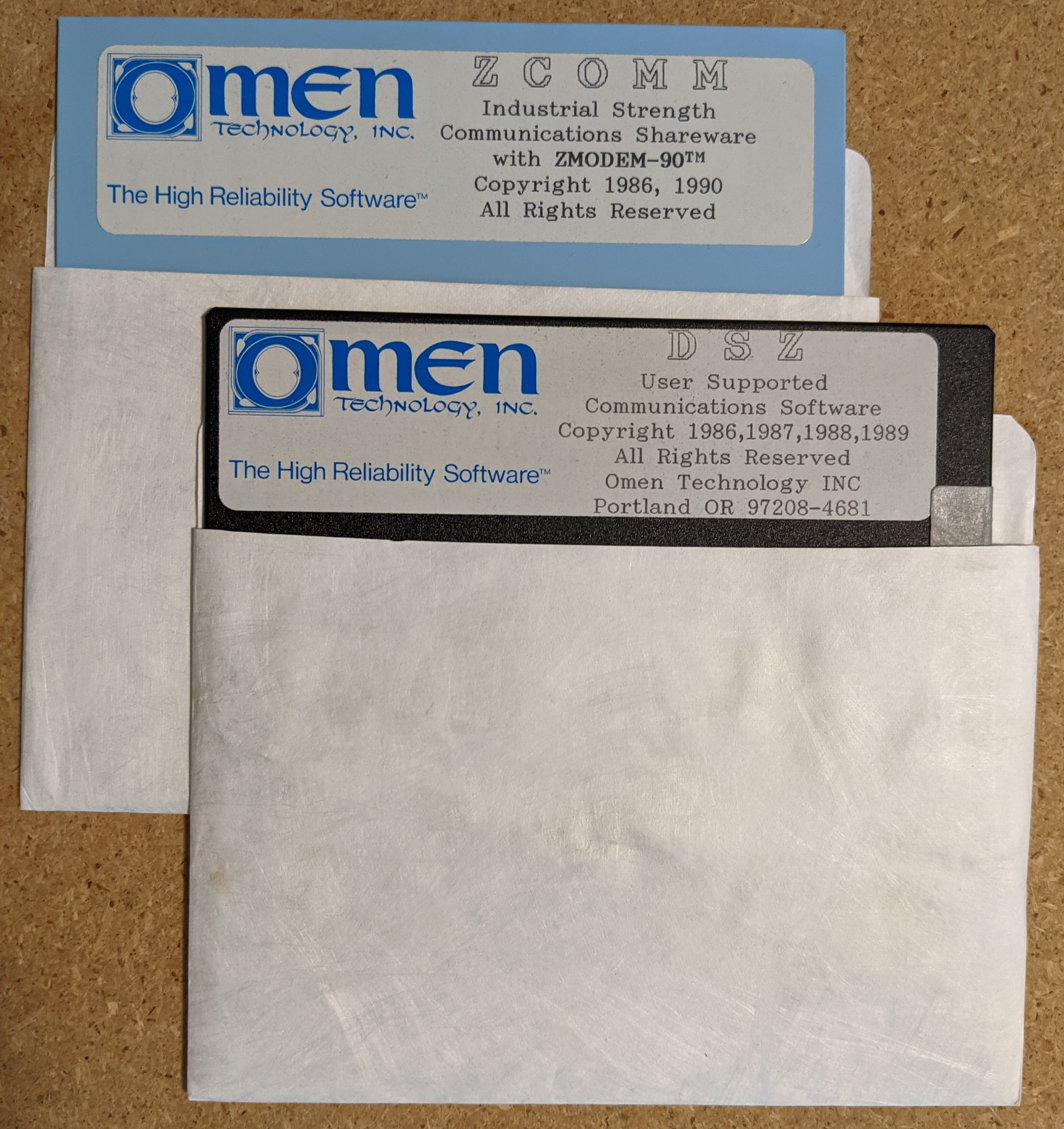
Diskette images for Omen Technology's ZComm and DSZ products (circa 1989–1990)

Jesse Walker cited Forsberg as a participant in WMAS, a pirate radio station at Western Military Academy in Alton, Illinois. He graduated from the academy in 1962.
