= PC Tools (software) =

Collection of software utlities

- Screenshot of PC Tools 1.10
- Developer: Central Point Software
- Initial release: 1985; 40 years ago
- Final release: 9.0, 2.0 (Windows)
- Operating system: DOS, Windows
- Type: software utilities

PC Tools is a collection of software utilities for DOS developed by Central Point Software.

== History of development ==
The original PC Tools package was first developed as a suite of utilities for DOS, released for retail in 1985 for $39.95.

With the introduction of version 4.0, the name was changed to PC Tools Deluxe, and the primary interface became a colorful graphical shell (previously the shell resembled PC BOSS and was monochrome.) By version 7.0 of the package in 1991 several Windows programs had been added to it.

Though the 7.0 version (1991) sold well, it was criticised in computer trade publications for being overcomplicated and riddled with bugs, and updated with the 7.1 version. It was widely considered to have been rushed to publication, despite the objections of many of Central Point Software's employees. PC Tools PRO (Version 9, 1993) for DOS was the last stable version released by Central Point Software before acquisition.

In June 1994 Central Point was acquired by their top competitor Symantec. The package MORE PC Tools was released by Symantec's Central Point Division in October 1994 and included additional utilities: Backtrack, CrashGuard Pro (ex-Central Point Recuperator), DriveCheck, DriveSpeed. After that the product line was ultimately discontinued. PC Tools was the main competitor to Norton Utilities, which Symantec had acquired in 1990.

Symantec now uses the PC Tools brand name, acquired from an Australian utilities and security software vendor in 2008, for low-cost antivirus and antispyware software.

The PC Tools brand was retired on December 4, 2013, and the website now refers visitors to products in Symantec's Norton product line.

== Utilities included ==
- PC Shell — a file manager, capable amongst other things of displaying the contents of data files used by various popular database, word-processor, and spreadsheet packages
- PC-Cache — a licensed disk cache of HyperCache from the HyperDisk Speed Kit
- PC-Secure — a file encryption utility
- Central Point Anti-Virus — an antivirus program.
- Central Point Backup — a backup utility for archiving and restoring data to and from disc or tape. In earlier releases, this utility was officially named "PC Backup". Innovative features included compression during backup and floppy disk spanning, and optional use of the Central Point Option Board for 33% faster disk writing.
- DiskFix — a utility for repairing on-disc file system data structures of a disc volume
- DiskEdit — a Disk editor
- Unformat — a utility that attempts to reverse the effects of a high-level format of a disc volume
- Undelete — a utility that attempts to recover a deleted file
- Mirror — a tool for storing the File Allocation Table to permit recovery of high-level formatted disks in combination with Unformat
- Compress — a disc volume defragmentation utility
- FileFix — a utility for repairing corruption to the data files used by various popular database, wordprocessor, and spreadsheet packages
- Commute — a remote control utility
- VDefend — a memory-resident computer virus detection utility
- SysInfo — a system information utility, incorporating diagnostics from 1993 onwards. The diagnostics were licensed from the Eurosoft (UK) product Pc-Check
- Central Point Desktop (CPS) — an alternative Windows desktop shell, supporting nested icon groups, file manager, resource monitoring dashboard, virtual desktops, launch menus and many other features

The Mirror, Undelete, and Unformat utilities were licensed by Central Point to Microsoft for inclusion in MS-DOS 5.0. Central Point Anti-Virus and VDefend were licensed as Microsoft AntiVirus and VSafe, respectively, in MS-DOS 6.0 through 6.22.
