= Polishing of Metal =

2006 CD-ROM e-book encyclopedia by Derek E. McDonald

- E-Book Encyclopedia on CD-ROM
- Cover art for Polishing of Metal.

Technical Specifications
- Units (volumes) in set: 2
- Publisher: Emperor Multimedia Corporation
- Author: Derek E. McDonald
- Country: Canada
- Release Date (local): August 23, 2006
- Release Date (world): September 10, 2006
- Date of Termination: March 17, 2013
- UPC: 775020745520
- License: Proprietary

Subject & Access of Publication
- Subject: History of Heavy metal Music
- Format: Compact Disc
- OS Compatibility: Windows, Macintosh, Unix, Linux
- Multimedia Interface: Adobe Acrobat PDF
- Website: Official website link

Polishing of Metal was the title of a 2 disc CD-ROM E-Book encyclopedia authored by Derek E. McDonald, manufactured by Sony Music and published by Emperor Multimedia Corporation August 23, 2006.

== History ==
The publication that would become Polishing of Metal (also known as: POM) took some eight years in total to develop. Its development was a happenstance of circumstances over that period.

=== First Publication ===
During 1995 computer programmer and heavy music enthusiast Derek McDonald began research on the origins of Heavy Metal Music as a personal project. Seeing that his McBBS project was winding down he needed a new project to pass his time. The original text that would eventually evolve into Polishing Of Metal, as it later became known, was a set of articles published in an obscure Gothic underground pulp publication named Legends Magazine released by Marcus Pan and his Inferno Publishing in Linden, New Jersey, United States in 1997 from February to December of that year. Pan agreed to release the early text as a form of gathering ratings from its readership. These articles went largely unseen in the larger society but remained popular amongst the magazine readers; the core content of those articles would become the central nucleus for Polishing Of Metal.

The original concept was Polishing of Metal would be printed book format but no publisher showed interest in what would be a specialty textbook on this form of music, and the cost of self-publishing proved to be prohibitive, so the project was set aside.

=== Technological & Commercial Development ===
The emerging technologies of Compact Discs and Multimedia would be the savior of the project. Soon after he set the project aside, McDonald decided to close up his computer company DMCS Technologies and start a new firm: Emperor Multimedia Corporation in 1998. The first publication of this venture was a CD dubbed The Alliance in 1999. The Alliance gave only a hint of what was to come for it contained a hidden track featuring biographical texts and photographs of the acts featured on the compilation disc. The software was primitive even to the standards of 1999 but the disc managed to chart and receive commercial air play, most specifically on Toronto’s Q-107 (CILQ-FM). The Alliance, along with the massive database of musical artists he had obtained through his business activities surrounding it, gave McDonald a huge advantage over competitors with unprecedented access to independent musicians with fresh talent loyal to his efforts.

After working on several private CD production contracts and software development, McDonald would resurrect the Polishing of Metal documents. The cost of CD production was plummeting and his access to the artists and technology now made it affordable to create complex multimedia projects for CD distribution. His first attempt at this was in the form of Recorded History, released December 31, 2002. In an attempt to attract a wider audience the disc centered more on the history of Rock Music in general, with the discussions on Heavy Metal maintaining a significant part of the over-all project. The multimedia presentation featured PDF encoded text, with 500 artist biographies, 900 album reviews and some 100 photographs. It featured a single music video by Robert Jackson and 14 audio tracks in MP3 format. Although the disc was a true multimedia production it lacked what the consumers were looking for and it fell short of popular demand.

=== Completion ===
McDonald took a couple of years to research the contents and improve the technology to rework the formula and return in 2006 with the modern day Polishing of Metal. Now centering purely on the life and times of Heavy Metal, Polishing of Metal managed to impress both the industry and music fans alike. Except for the graphic arts, music & video conversions, the entire Polishing of Metal project was written and conceived by Derek McDonald. The elements that made Recorded History a true interactive multimedia experience were still there but they were augmented with the glitz of entertainment. This time featuring some 19 music videos, 5 and a half hours of music in both MP3 and standard audio format allowing the disc promotion on radio, some 5000 pages of PDF & HTML encoded text, Internet links and 1304 artist biographies with some 900 album reviews. The cover art was updated to feature a new rendition of long-time mascot Skel (Skel has appeared on the cover of all of McDonald’s projects) and was drawn by Barry Waddell of Florida, USA act Seasons Of The Wolf.

The Internet links component was an added bonus as it allowed the CD-ROM to interface directly with the RRCA (Rock Record Collector’s Association) artist biography database known as the Music Knowledge Base, effectively extending the CD-ROM’s shelf-life by allowing purchaser of the disc to augment the CD's permanent listings with new information with a click of the mouse and free of charge. Indeed, the RRCA’s database provided much of the biographical and review commentary seen on the CD-ROM, several specially made applications were developed during the creation of the project with the sole purpose of converting the data the RRCA contained. Coupled with this feature was another link system that allowed connection to albums featured in the document that were also on sale at Diskery, McDonald's own on-line music store; not to mention the links to artist websites.

Polishing of Metal was cleverly engineered as there was a large amount of "hidden technology" behind the operation of it. This technology was featured from the start where a special program was on the disc that allowed the CD-ROM to bootstrap all the needed applications at start-up instead of the single application start provided by Windows; the application could also detect and stop disc execution if the needed support software was not in the computer. Although the data on the disc can be viewed on several OS platforms, this special autostart program only worked on Windows. Other OSes must start the disc manually; instructions were provided. This limitation was later overcome.

As an added feature the disc also had an extensive interactive help database/user manual programmed onto it, as well as a dictionary of industry and Heavy Metal cultural terminology called the "Metalopedia". Each genuine copy of Polishing of Metal was custom engraved with the text: EMPEROR MULTIMEDIA POLISHING OF METAL CD-ROM ERC4-EB etched into the reflection hub band of the CDs. The entire capacity of the 2 CDs is used, leaving only about 1MB of free space on each, left as a buffer to allow for copy errors during the duplication process.

=== Termination ===
For all of its advancements, Polishing of Metal suffered a major handicap: It was expensive to produce. Completed during a sort of economic boom to its publishing company, Emperor Multimedia, by 2013 the tide had changed. Money was not as easy to come by and the market for Compact Discs was faltering. Unable to gain financing for a follow-up, the project was terminated. Emperor Multimedia Corporation ended all compact disc manufacture and production shortly after. On March 17, 2013 the last shipment of CDs were shipped for commercial sale, the remaining inventory was given to charity. The date was carefully chosen as it coincided with the release date of the firm's first production, The Alliance of March 17, 1999. McDonald purchased all rights to the intellectual properties held by Emperor Multimedia to that date so he could continue production in the digital realm on a potential future website called 'The Diskery Music Archives' to take the place of his defunct music on-line retail shop The Diskery and the RRCA Music Archives.

== Significance ==
The legacy of Polishing of Metal was not so much the story of its author, its technology, or any artist featured on it, but the statement it made to the recording industry. During the early part of the 21st century recording companies were suffering financial blows due to the encroachment of the computer industry and the wide availability of the Internet allowing consumers to download audio tracks or wholesale copy music in digital format anywhere on Earth. Indeed, many computer companies such as Apple Inc. with their successful iPod product quietly but indirectly encouraged this behavior to boost their profits. The cost of distribution of the now 25-year-old Compact Disc technology was becoming prohibitive.

McDonald’s approach was a simple one, "if you can’t beat them then join them. Use that same technology to impress the customer enough they will want to buy the compact disc", as he once said in a famous radio interview. He used the music to sell his technology and not the reverse that tended to be normal operation, and to keep costs low he distributed the disc exclusively via his own company and restricted sales only to on-line (internet) retailers. This approach may have slowed the sales of the project, but it allowed a more profitable distribution and manufacturing model. Polishing of Metal was, for its time, the most advanced E-book ever made and the first on this subject matter. It showcased many unknown acts while demonstrating some of the latest techniques in publishing and multimedia technology. It once and for all sealed the gap between the entertainment and electronics industries. On August 12, 2007 it was inducted into the UNESCO Great Library of Alexandria (Bibliotheca Alexandrina).

Many people believe that the creation of Alliance, Recorded History and Polishing of Metal form a sort of deliberately developed trilogy. Fact is they do not. The projects are mutually exclusive of each other.

== Special Interest ==
- The video for the band Penetrator featured on the CD is the only video ever made for this band. The video was only ever published on Polishing of Metal and was never seen anywhere else, although the intention was for mass distribution. This video is the only live-action ever seen of Derek McDonald for he appears on one of his own projects for the first time. He is the leather-clad biker on the left when he and band singer (and personal friend) Maxel Black encounter the seductive lady in the alleyway; another scene featuring him in Gothic attire was cut from the final copy. The video was filmed at the Gladstone Hotel (Toronto), a location suggested by McDonald.
- Derek McDonald is also the founder of Diskery on-line heavy metal music database.

== Sources and references ==
- Oakville Beaver Newspaper, Local Entrepreneur Referred To As Next Bill Gates, (Oakville, Ontario, Canada: Wednesday, January 6, 1999).
- Legends Magazine, Inferno Publishing, The Polishing of Metal, February (Issue # 64) – December (Issue #75), (Linden, New Jersey, USA, 1997).
- Official Polishing of Metal website.
- NWR (internet radio station), Weekly Business Report: The Demise of the Compact Disc (Part 3), (Toronto, Ontario, Canada, June 25, 2013).
