= Wildcat! BBS =

Bulletin board system server

- Developer: Mustang Software
- Release: 1986
- Platform: MS-DOS, Microsoft Windows
- Type: bulletin board system server application

Wildcat! BBS is a bulletin board system server application that Mustang Software developed in 1986 for MS-DOS (up through version 4.x), and later ported to Microsoft Windows (version 5 and later).

The product was later expanded to integrate Internet access under the name WINServer (Wildcat! Interactive Net Server). Mustang sold Wildcat! to Santronics Software, Inc. on November 19, 1998. Santronics had been an active third-party developer for the Wildcat! product lines since 1991.

== See also ==
- List of BBS software
- List of terminal emulators
