= Telebit =

Defunct US modem manufacturer

Telebit Corporation
- Industry: Telecommunications
- Founded: 1984; 42 years ago in Cupertino, California
- Founder: Paul Baran
- Defunct: 1998
- Fate: Acquired by Digi International
- Headquarters: Chelmsford, United States
- Products: TrailBlazer
- Website: telebit.com at the Wayback Machine (archived 1997-06-07)

Telebit Corporation was a US-based modem manufacturer, known for their TrailBlazer series of high-speed modems. One of the first modems to routinely exceed 9600 bit/s speeds, the TrailBlazer used a proprietary modulation scheme that proved highly resilient to interference, earning the product an almost legendary reputation for reliability despite mediocre (or worse) line quality. They were particularly common in Unix installations in the 1980s and 1990s.

The high price of the Telebit modems was initially not a concern as their performance was equally high compared to other systems. However, as new designs using V.32 and V.32bis began to arrive in the early 1990s, Telebit's price/performance ratio was seriously eroded. A series of new designs followed, but these never regained their performance lead. By the mid-1990s the company had been part of a series of mergers and eventually disappeared in 1998 after being acquired by Digi International.

== Startup ==
Telebit was founded by Paul Baran, one of the inventors of the packet switching networking concept. Baran had recently started a networking company known as Packet Technologies on Bubb Road in Cupertino, California, which was working on systems for interactive television. While working there, he hit on the idea for a new way to implement high-speed modems, and started Telebit across the street. Packet Technologies was a major beta customer for Telebit in late 1985. Packet Technologies later failed, and several of their employees were folded into Telebit, while most of the others formed StrataCom, makers of the first Asynchronous Transfer Mode (ATM) switches.

== PEP and the TrailBlazer ==
T2000 Dialing, negotiating and communicating
Two PEP modems connecting. At the start is speed negotiation, then measurement of line quality, and finally the rapid-fire sound of the constant switching of the direction of transmission, since no data is being transferred.

In contrast to then-existing ITU Telecommunication Standardization Sector (ITU-T) V-series protocols, such as the common 2400 bit/s V.22bis, the TrailBlazers' used a proprietary modulation system known as Packetized Ensemble Protocol (PEP), based on orthogonal frequency-division multiplexing (OFDM). It employed a large number (initially up to 512) of closely spaced carrier frequencies, each modulated at 6 baud, encoding 0, 2, 4 or 6 bits per interval. Under favorable conditions, the devices could reach data rates of 6 baud x 6 bits-per-baud x 512 carriers = 18432 bits per second (bit/s). If a particular carrier was distorted, attenuated or interfered with, it could be turned off, allowing the data rate to degrade gracefully in steps of 10 bit/s with decreasing line quality.

Using a large number of carriers spread across the phone network's bandwidth meant that the chance that any one carrier would be subject to a problem was high. In order to correct for the unavoidable errors this would cause, the Trailblazers were one of the earlier implementations of the MNP error-correcting protocols. Although these protocols added overhead, and errors caused further overhead, the combination of all of these features still provided much higher throughput than conventional designs running on the same lines. In contrast, a typical V.22bis 2400 bit/s modem might suffer from a smaller number of errors in a given time, but those errors would require longer to fix through re-transmission at the slower speed. If those errors were being caused by a constant source of noise on those frequencies, PEP could turn those carriers off, while the 2400 bit/s modem could do nothing about this.

Most modems of the era were set up with both channels with equal speed (full duplex), or, in the case where data was primarily sent in one direction, with a single high-speed channel (half duplex). The TrailBlazer instead allowed any one of its 512 channels to be assigned to transfer data in either direction, a technique they termed "adaptive duplex". The modem was designed to use most of the bandwidth in a single direction, with a relatively low-speed reverse channel. The modems at the two ends of the connection would negotiate line turnarounds, reversing the directions of the high-speed and low-speed channels, based on the amount of data queued for transmission in each modem.

While this adaptive duplex scheme was able to send large files quickly, for users accustomed to having the distant computer echo characters, the delay associated with having the digital signal processors (DSP) take turns using the bandwidth tended to make interactive typing difficult, as there could be as much as a second and a half delay for a single character echo. This also caused problems for file transfer protocols, e.g., UUCP 'g' or Kermit, where a small packet of data was sent by one computer, followed by a wait for acknowledgment from the receiver ("send and wait").

The TrailBlazer addressed this problem through a technique known as "protocol spoofing". When the local computer sent a packet to the modem for transmission, the modem's controller immediately sent an ACK message, generated locally. This fooled the computer into thinking the packet had already reached the far end, prompting it to send another packet. The error correction normally being provided in the transfer protocol was instead handled using a proprietary replacement protocol operating on top of MNP. In general, spoofing offered greatly improved performance with any protocol that used small packets, and thus generated many ACK messages; the TrailBlazers initially supported UUCP, and support for XMODEM, YMODEM, SDLC and Kermit followed.

Support for these features did not come cheaply; the TrailBlazer Plus, for instance, used a Texas Instruments TMS32010 DSP processor for the actual modulation and demodulation functions, and a Motorola 68000 for control. This meant that the TrailBlazers were significantly more expensive than most other modems. However, their speed and spoofing ability made the TrailBlazer modems extremely popular in the Unix world, as they could dramatically improve UUCP throughput, even at low connection speeds on very noisy lines. Improvements of over seven times faster than a 2400 bit/s modem were not uncommon. Sites that required long-distance telephone calls to exchange UUCP mail could pay for the price of a TrailBlazer in long-distance savings fairly quickly.

The Trailblazers also introduced an extensive set of commands for setting up its various options. While most of the simple commands were based on the Hayes command set, like dialing a number or hanging up a phone, their proprietary capabilities were supported by proprietary commands and syntax. Most of these took the form of register=value pairs, leading to extremely long and almost undecipherable setup strings.

In 1988 Telebit added the T1000, essentially a TrailBlazer limited to a lower-speed 9600 bit/s version of PEP, remaining compatible at that speed with existing TrailBlazers. The T2000 added support for synchronous communications, typically used between mainframe computers. The original TrailBlazer, T1000 and T2000 were backwards-compatible with the 2400 bit/s V.22bis standard, allowing them to connect with what was then the most common modem speed when talking to other brands of modems.

== NetBlazer ==
Another Telebit product was the first on-demand Internet dialup router, the NetBlazer. The product was developed by a team led by Mike Ballard, formerly of Packet, who eventually became Telebit's CEO in 1992.

The original NetBlazer was a standard PC with a serial card connected to user supplied external modems by serial cables. Later smaller versions, the PN and STi, were offered which consisted of a small-form-factor PC combined with custom software and one of a variety of modems or other connection systems (ISDN, etc.) combined into a large modem-like box. Administrators connected to it via Ethernet, which was also used for maintenance commands and setup.

In its first release the NetBlazer software supported TCP/IP using SLIP, but a later upgrade added Point-to-Point Protocol (PPP) and support for IPX and AppleTalk. The protocol stack was a commercially licensed and heavily modified version of KA9Q. A later low-end model, the NetBlzer LS, switched from the Intel 80386 to the Motorola MC68EN360 SoC.

== Increasing speeds ==
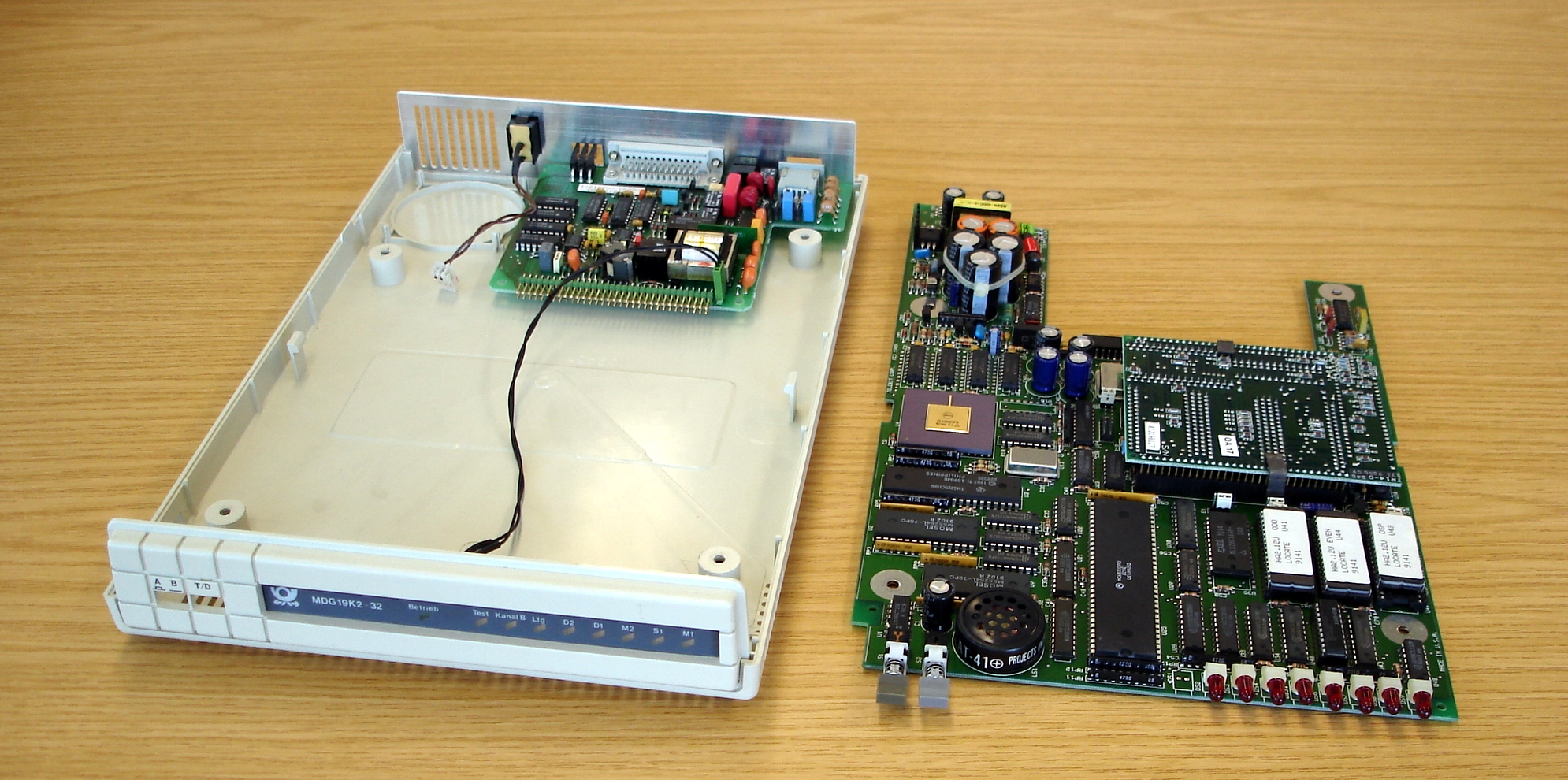
Telebit T2500 from about 1989

Telebit had their initial public offering in April 1990, which raised about $20.2 million. It traded on NASDAQ with the symbol TBIT.

The first multi-company standard for 9600 bit/s dialup modems was V.32, introduced in 1989. Initially V.32 modems were very expensive, but Rockwell aggressively attacked this market, introducing modules, and eventually entire chipsets, that brought the prices down. Telebit first offered V.32 support in the T2500, which used the Trailblazer/T2000 hardware with the addition of the Rockwell V.32 modem module. A version without PEP support was offered as the T1500. The later T1600 had basically the same feature set as the T1500, but used Telebit's own V.32 implementation rather than the Rockwell module, resulting in reduced production cost and better performance. Both the T1500 and T1600 had list prices over $1000; at the time a 1st tier product from Hayes or USRobotics (USR) generally cost about $700.

The V.32bis standard, increasing the bit rate to 14,400 bit/s, was introduced in 1991. In this case Rockwell quickly released a V.32bis chipset, appearing on the market so rapidly that Rockwell-based systems generally pre-dated implementations from dedicated modem companies. Rockwell also aggressively priced the V.32bis product line, allowing modems based on them to sell at price points around $300, the point formerly held by 2400 bit/s models that offered no error correction or compression, nor fax capabilities. All of the 1st-tier companies had serious difficulties adapting to a market that was now filled with low-cost modems with similar or better performance and features than their own high-end models.

Telebit started slipping in terms of relative performance, while still trying to sell their products at their traditional high price points. They introduced the T3000 with V.32bis but without PEP, though a PEP upgrade was announced as a future upgrade. This did not happen, instead, Telebit re-released the design in early 1994 as the $1,099 WorldBlazer model; essentially a T3000 with the new 23,000 bit/s TurboPEP mode. TurboPEP used the same modulation scheme as the original PEP, but changed the encoding to allow up to 7 bits per baud. An upgrade from the T3000 to WorldBlazer was sold, consisting of two firmware ROMs and a PAL chip.

There were some design studies of a possible full-duplex PEP using echo cancellation (as is used in V.32), and this technology was proposed to the CCITT (now known as the ITU-T) for possible adoption as the V.fast modem standard. However, more conventional modem technology was chosen and standardized as V.34. Telebit deemed full-duplex PEP to require more engineering effort than was justified by the shrinking market for PEP modems, and never introduced this feature.

== The Octocom merger and the FastBlazer V.34 modem ==
The CCITT moved quickly to improve on V.32bis, and by 1993 it was clear that the ratification process for their new 28,800 bit/s V.34 standard was going to be finalized in 1994. Companies lined up to start production of new V.34 designs, some going so far to introduce models based on interim standards, such as V.FC.

Telebit's modem engineering team developed a plan for a V.34 modem, but the executive staff believed that it was important to get a product to market more quickly. To that end, they began looking for other modem companies to acquire, and in January 1993 announce that Telebit would acquire Octocom Systems, a small privately held modem company in Massachusetts. Octocom had a V.34 modem in development which was expected to be ready for shipment quickly. Almost all modem engineering activities at Telebit's California offices ceased, though NetBlazer engineering continued to be based in California until the end of 1995.

The Telebit FastBlazer 8840 V.34 modem was introduced in May 1994. When the FastBlazer was first introduced it did not include V.34 support, with management stating that they couldn't do so because the standard was not yet ratified. Although this was true (for one month anyway, it was ratified in June), the FastBlazer did not ship with an interim standard either; even AT&T's largely ignored 19,200 bit/s V.32terbo would only be available as a post-release upgrade in July, there were no plans to support the widespread V.FC at all, and no date was set for full V.34 support other than "two or three months".

Making matters worse, the FastBlazer didn't include fax support. While Telebit stated that an upgrade to add this would be available, they also stated they would be charging for it. Nor would the FastBlazer support PEP, which, although by then a minor consideration for most potential buyers, was still a differentiator for Telebit's existing installed base. For sites with a Telebit modem on at least one end of a link, a PEP-capable upgrade might be worthwhile. Without PEP, the FastBlazer had essentially no advantage over any other V.34 modem.

All this for an introductory price of $1,399, when V.32bis faxmodems were available for $200 or less, and industrial-quality V.34 designs were soon available for under $500.

It took seven months before Telebit introduced V.34 support in January 1995, also releasing the $399 TeleBlazer "low-end" model at the same time. By this point even long-time supporters were publicly pooh-poohing the company on the Usenet, the medium that originally drove the widespread adoption of the TrailBlazer.

== Next phase ==
Late in 1993 Telebit completed their merger with Octocom, the idea being to use Octocom's Chelmsford, Massachusetts manufacturing capability headed by veteran executive Bryan Holley, as executive vice president of worldwide operations, downsizing the existing Sunnyvale office to become a NetBlazer development site under the supervision of James Norrod. The Sunnyvale facility was closed to reduce costs. Higher than expected operating costs resulted in stagnation with the development of new products. The difficult integration of the Sunnyvale operation into the corporate Chelmsford, MA headquarters was fraught with more difficulties than those of finance and marketing. Both companies had a staunch and loyal following of customers and the surprise that the acquiring Telebit gaining Octocom would, in effect, flip around as Octocom essentially absorbing Telebit left some customers and many non-surviving post-merger employees bitter. By March 1996 the company had exhausted its line of credit, reducing cash by $3.2 million on revenues of $12.7 million in the quarter.

In July 1996 Telebit was acquired by Cisco Systems for $200 million, primarily for their channelized T1 digital-modem technology, modem ISDN channel aggregation (MICA). Telebit management convinced Cisco to spin off the company including all existing product families as well as a paid-up license for the use of MICA in future products developed by the spinoff to one of the existing management team (James D. Norrod) to become Telebit Incorporated and based in Chelmsford.

In August 1997 Telebit merged with ITK Telekommunikation, based in Dortmund Germany. Telebit executive vice president Bryan Holley was named president and chief executive officer for the new ITK Telecommunications, Inc. under which leading the newly minted ITK through further M&A activity culminating with the combined company being acquired in July 1998 by Digi International, makers of the DigiBoard multi-port serial card for PCs.

== Legacy ==
While the Trailblazers have generally been displaced by modems implementing the higher-rate V.34/V.90 series standards, and although they have been out of production since the mid-1990s, many TrailBlazers continue to be in operation to this date, and repair services are still available.

In 1995, a Silicon Valley engineer sent a Worldblazer to an NGO in Somalia, which promptly put it to work connecting that remote country to the Internet, at first by UUCP, then by other means.

== Models ==
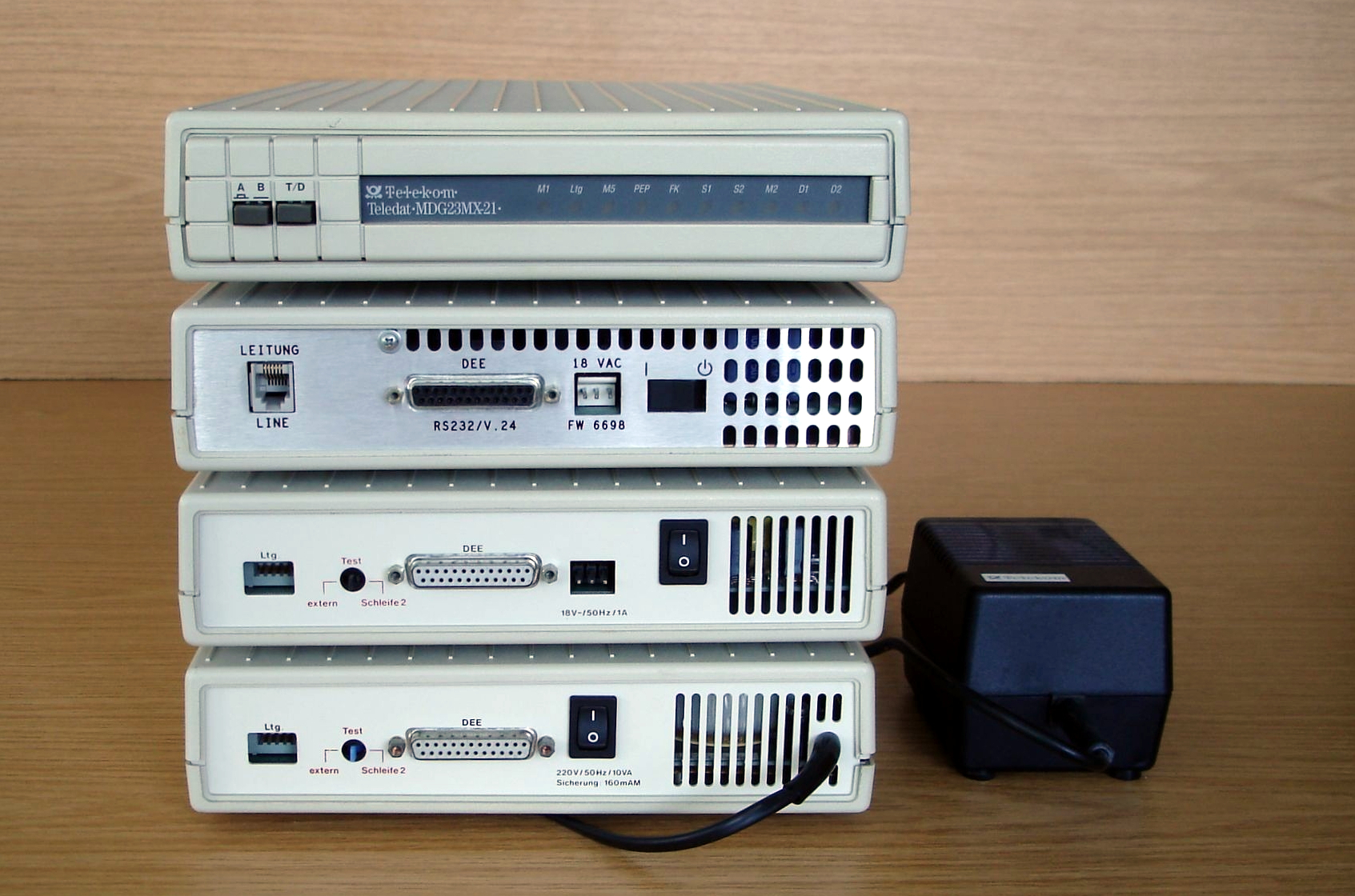
German version of T2000, T2500 and T3000 (with Turbo-PEP)

| Model | Year | Capabilities |
|---|---|---|
| Trailblazer | 1985 | Original model, approximately 18,000 bit/s |
| Trailblazer Plus | 1987 | performance improvement, over 19,000 bit/s |
| T2000 | 1988 | synchronous link support |
| T1000 | 1988 | lower-cost model limited to 9600 bit/s |
| T2500 | 1989 | T2000 + V.32 (9600 bit/s) support added based on Rockwell module |
| Cellblazer | 1989 | for use with cellphones |
| T1500 | 1990 | V.32 (9600 bit/s) without PEP, Rockwell based |
| NetBlazer | 1990 | Ethernet-connected on-demand SLIP and PPP router |
| T1600 | 1991 | V.32, Telebit-internal implementation |
| T3000 | 1991 | V.32bis (14400 bit/s) and fax support |
| QBlazer | 1991 | V.32 (9600 bit/s) battery-powered portable modem |
| WorldBlazer | 1992 | T3000 with TurboPEP (23,000 bit/s) and, later, fax |
| QBlazer+ | 1993 | V.32bis (14400 bit/s) version of the QBlazer |
| FastBlazer | 1994 | V.34 (28800 bit/s) |
| TeleBlazer | 1995 | "low cost" V.34 |
