= LANlord =

Management system

LANlord was a DOS, Windows, and OS/2 workstation management system originally developed by Client Server Technologies Group, which got seed funding from Microcom who ultimately later sold the LANlord group in February 1994 to Central Point Software (acquired by Symantec Corporation in 1994).

LANlord offered a client–server architecture where distributed clients, called Agents, ran on workstations and reported back to, and took orders from, centralized servers that were accessed via a remote Manager Console. LANlord features include automatic inventory of hardware, software, driver and configuration information, software metering, virus detection and repair, remote viewing and editing of system files and integration with Microcom's Carbon Copy, a "remote control" software.

== See also ==
- Central Point Software
- Microcom
