= Mustang Software =

Mustang Software, Inc. was a California-based corporation that developed telecommunications software products. Mustang was incorporated in 1988, became a public corporation (NASDAQ ticker symbol MSTG) in 1995. The company was acquired by Quintus Corporation in 2000.

Mustang's first software products were distributed as shareware. As the company grew, it switched to selling through retail channels. Later, Mustang stopped distributing physical products and sold digital licenses for its software.

== Products ==
=== Wildcat! BBS ===
For most of its lifetime, Mustang's flagship product was Wildcat! BBS. Wildcat! was a bulletin board system that computer users could dial into using a modem to communicate with other users online. Initially, only one user could be dialed into the system at one time, but technological advances later allowed more than one user to be online simultaneously and to interact with one another.

The first versions of Wildcat! were for MS-DOS. In the mid-1990s, Mustang developed a new version called WINServer that for 32-bit Windows.

Wildcat! was sold to Santronics Software, Inc. in 1998 as Mustang wanted to concentrate on its new software products.

=== Qmodem Pro ===
Mustang bought Qmodem from The Forbin Project in 1992 and renamed it to Qmodem Pro. Qmodem Pro was an MS-DOS-based communications program, intended for use by computer users to dial into BBS systems.

Mustang developed versions of Qmodem Pro for 16-bit and 32-bit version of Windows. Support for RIP was added in 1993.

Qmodem Pro continued to be sold by Mustang through 2000, and the rights to it were purchased by Quintus.

=== Internet Message Center ===
Internet Message Center (IMC), was designed to handle incoming corporate email. The email was filtered, sorted, tracked, and distributed to agents (people who would respond to the email). Agent responses would be routed back through IMC so a complete history of email conversations with a customer could be recorded. IMC also provided reporting features to analyze email performance. The rights to IMC were purchased by Quintus in 2000.

== History ==
- September 1986: Jim Harrer starts Mustang Software in the bedroom of his Bakersfield, California home.
- March 1987: The first version of the company's Wildcat! software ships. It is designed to let computers connect to electronic bulletin boards via modem.
- December 23, 1988: Mustang Software is incorporated in California.
- 1991: The third version of Mustang's Wildcat! software is released, generating success for the fledgling business.
- April 1995: Mustang Software completes its first offering of common stock. Almost immediately following its decision to go public, the company's fortunes began to erode as bulletin board software is rendered obsolete by web browsers.
- 1995 and 1996: Mustang's first attempts to develop web browser software are overshadowed by Netscape Navigator and Microsoft Internet Explorer. Cutbacks shrink company staff from a high of around 60 people to only 30. Mustang records heavy losses as profits plummet.
- September 1997: Mustang releases Internet Message Center software to critical acclaim. Supporting software is also released that year. The software allows companies to efficiently route, track and answer e-mail from customers.
- September 1998: Mustang issues an additional $1.5 million in company stock to bolster dwindling cash resources. Investors also provide a $5 million line of equity credit. The move prevents Mustang from losing its place on the Nasdaq Small Cap market.
- November 19, 1998: Mustang sells its Wildcat! software to Florida-based Santronics Software, Inc.
- April 1999: Mustang posts its first profit in 12 consecutive quarters, recording a $10,299 improvement in its bottom line.
- Second through fourth quarters 1999: Mustang again posts moderate losses as it builds a national sales force, regenerating its employee rolls to 62 people. Profits skyrocket as Internet Message Center finds a host of major clients in the business world.
- October 1999: Mustang Software changes its name to Mustang.com.
- February 28, 2000: Mustang.com announces a planned merger with Quintus Corp. Quintus will acquire Mustang for $290 million in stock. Quintus's IMC is eventually purchased by Avaya.
