= Central Point Software =

Company

- Industry: Software Development
- Founded: 1980; 46 years ago in Central Point, Oregon
- Founder: Michael Burmeister-Brown
- Defunct: 1994
- Fate: Acquired by Symantec
- Headquarters: Beaverton
- Parent: Gen Digital

Central Point Software, Inc. (CP, CPS, Central Point) was a leading software utilities maker for the PC market, supplying utilities software for the MS-DOS and Microsoft Windows markets. It also produced Apple II copy programs. Through a series of mergers, the company was acquired by Symantec in 1994.

== History ==
CPS was founded by Michael Burmeister-Brown (Mike Brown) in 1980 in Central Point, Oregon, for which the company was named. Building on the success of its Copy II PC backup utility, it moved to Beaverton, Oregon. In 1990, Corey Smith was president. In 1993 CPS acquired the XTree Company. It was itself acquired by Symantec in 1994, for around $60 million.

== Products ==
The company's most important early product was a series of utilities which enabled evasion of copy protection, allowing exact duplicates to be made of copy-protected diskettes, duplicating the analog fingerprinting measures. The first version, Copy II Plus v1.0 (for the Apple II), was released in June 1981. With the success of the IBM PC and compatibles, a version for that platform - Copy II PC (copy2pc) - was released in 1983. As of August 1985 CPS said that Copy II PC was capable of copying 90% of software.

By then CPS said it had sold 10,000 Copy II PC Deluxe Boards, at a rate of several thousand a month. Mostly marketed to existing customers of Copy II PC, the expansion card comes with a special version of that software. CPS said that 1,000 beta testers found that the card was capable of copying Softguard's Superlock, and only failing against Prolok. The card is able to read, write, and copy disks from Apple II and Macintosh computer systems as well. Copy II PC's main competitor was Quaid Software's CopyWrite, which did not have a hardware component.

CPS also released Option Board hardware with TransCopy software for duplicating copy-protected floppy diskettes.

In 1985, CPS released PC Tools, an integrated graphical DOS shell and utilities package. PC Tools was an instant success and became Central Point's flagship product, and positioned the company as the major competitor to Peter Norton Computing and its Norton Utilities and Norton Commander. CPS later manufactured a Macintosh version called Mac Tools. CPS licensed the Mirror, Undelete, and Unformat components of PC Tools to Microsoft for inclusion in MS-DOS versions 5.x and 6.x as external DOS utilities. CPS File Manager was ahead of its time, with features such as view ZIP archives as directories and a file/picture viewer.

In 1993, CPS released PC Tools for Windows 2.0 which ran on Windows 3.1. After the Symantec acquisition the programmer group that created PCTW 2.0 created Norton Navigator for Windows 95 and Symantec unbundled the File Manager used in PCTW 2.0 and released it as PC-Tools File Manager 3.0 for Windows 3.1

The lateness of PCTW to the Windows market was a major factor in why CPS was acquired by Symantec. Windows Server at the time was not viewed as a credible alternative to Novell NetWare - the first version of Windows Server was released in 1993 - and the desktop and server software products market was completely centered on Novell NetWare. The subsequent stumble by Novell to maintain dominance in the server market came years later and had nothing to do with the acquisition. Instead, like many software vendors, CPS underestimated how rapidly users were going to shift to Windows from DOS.

CPS's other major desktop product was Central Point Anti-Virus (CPAV), whose main competitor was Norton AntiVirus. CPAV was a licensed version of Carmel Software's Turbo Anti-Virus; CPS, in turn, licensed CPAV to Microsoft to create Microsoft Antivirus for DOS (MSAV) and Windows (MWAV).

CPS also released CPAV for Netware 3.xx and 4.x Netware servers in 1993.

Central Point also sold the Apple II clone Laser 128 by mail.

== List of CPS products ==
- PC Tools
- PC Tools for Windows
- Central Point Anti-Virus
- Central Point Anti-Virus for NetWare
- Central Point Backup
- Central Point Desktop
- Central Point Commute
- Copy II Plus (for Apple II)
- Copy II 64 (for Commodore 64/128)
- Copy II PC
- Copy II Mac
- Copy II ST (for Atari ST/TT series computers)
- MacTools and MacTools Pro
- More PC Tools
- LANlord
- Deluxe Option Board

== See also ==
- List of mergers and acquisitions by Symantec
