= MSAV =

Antivirus program

Microsoft Anti-Virus
- Developer: Central Point Software
- Initial release: March 30, 1993; 33 years ago
- Operating system: MS-DOS, Windows 3.1x
- Platform: IA-32
- Size: MSAV.EXE: 236 KB; VSAFE.COM: 62 KB; Virus Definitions: 60 KB
- Available in: English
- Type: Antivirus software
- License: Proprietary

Microsoft Anti-Virus (MSAV) is an antivirus program introduced by Microsoft for its MS-DOS operating system. The program first appeared in MS-DOS version 6.0 (1993) and last appeared in MS-DOS 6.22. The first version of the antivirus program was basic, had no inbuilt update facility (updates had to be obtained from a BBS and manually installed by the user) and could scan for 1,234 different viruses. Microsoft Anti-Virus for Windows (MWAV), included as part of the package, was a front end that allowed MSAV to run properly on Windows 3.1x.

In 2009, Microsoft launched an in-house antivirus solution named Microsoft Security Essentials, which later was phased out in favor of Microsoft Defender.

== History ==
Microsoft Anti-Virus was supplied by Central Point Software Inc. (later acquired by Symantec in 1994 and integrated into Symantec's Norton AntiVirus product) and was a stripped-down version of the Central Point Anti-Virus (CPAV) product which Central Point Software Inc., had licensed from Carmel Software Engineering in Haifa, Israel. Carmel Software sold the product as Turbo Anti-Virus both domestically and abroad.

Microsoft Anti-Virus for Windows was also provided by Central Point Software.

== Features ==
MSAV featured the "Detect and Clean" strategy and the detection of boot sector and Trojan horse-type viruses (which were typical virus problems at that time).

The program also had an anti-stealth and check sum feature that could be used to detect any changes in normal files. This technology was intended to make up for the unavailability of regular update packages. The final update of MSAV was released in June 1996 by Symantec. The update added the ability to detect polymorphic viruses and the virus definitions were updated to scan for a total of 2,371 viruses.

=== VSafe TSR ===
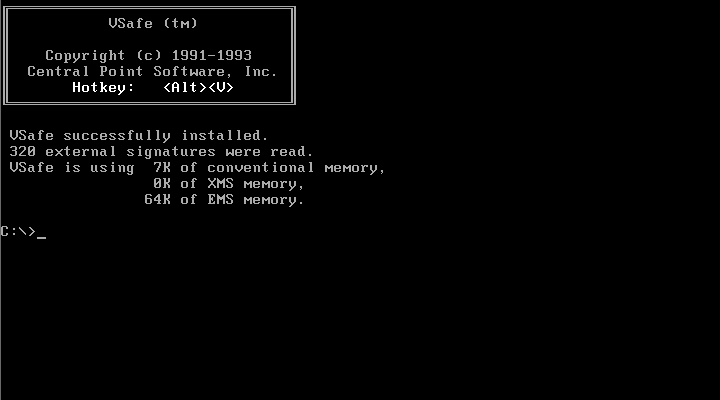
VSafe TSR running on MS-DOS 6.22

VSafe is a terminate and stay resident component of MSAV that provided real-time virus protection.

By default, VSafe does the following:

- Checks executable files for viruses (on execution).
- Checks all disks (hard drive and floppy) for boot sector viruses.
- Warns of attempts to write to the boot sector or partition table of the hard disk
- Warns of formatting that could erase the hard disk.

There are more features that can be enabled, VSafe can:

- Warn of attempts of executable files to terminate and stay resident (by normal methods).
- Prevent programs from writing to disk.
- Warn of attempts to write to the boot sector of a floppy disk.
- Warn of attempts to modify executable files.

VSafe had a number of virus definitions embedded within its executable and was capable of loading additional signatures (updates) from an external definition file.

== See also ==
- Internet Security
