= Magnesium Media =

British computer magazine

Magnesium Media is a computer magazine company based in Stockport, Greater Manchester, in the United Kingdom. Most of its published titles are now discontinued

It also publishes one-off guides to specific areas of computing, and downloadable technology guides under the brand 'Guidaroo'.

PC Explorer, PC Utilities, PC Tools, and TipStation were formerly published by Magnesium Media. PC Tools and TipStation were discontinued a few months later.

== PC Explorer ==
PC Explorer
- Editor: David Nield
- Categories: Computer magazines
- Frequency: Every 8 weeks
- Final issue: August 2009
- Company: Magnesium Media Ltd
- Country: United Kingdom
- Language: English
- Website: www.magnesiummedia.com
- ISSN: 1477-9846

PC Explorer was a computer magazine published in the United Kingdom by Magnesium Media. Its editor was David Nield. The magazine was discontinued in August 2009, after almost ten years in production.

== PC Utilities ==
PC Utilities
- Editor: Ian Barker
- Categories: Computer magazines
- Frequency: Monthly
- First issue: April, 2000
- Final issue: 22 July 2012
- Company: Magnesium Media Ltd
- Country: United Kingdom
- Language: English
- Website: www.magnesiummedia.com
- ISSN: 1469-042X

PC Utilities was a monthly computer magazine published in the UK. PC Utilities was discontinued on 22 July 2012.

The magazine described itself as "the definitive guide to free Windows software". Each issue came with a DVD coverdisc (initially one, two or even three CDs with earlier issues), containing hundreds of freeware and shareware programs. The content of the magazine included tutorials, features and workshops with a bias towards Windows software and typical home user tasks.

Launched in spring 2000 the magazine was originally produced by Live Publishing Ltd and edited by its Publishing Director Wayne Williams, before Keir Thomas took over with issue 4. Gavin Burrell became editor with issue 40. In August 2005, Live Publishing went into administration and the title was then acquired by Magnesium Media Ltd, retaining Burrell as editor before he was succeeded by Ian Barker.

The magazine spawned several less-frequently published companion titles, including PC Utilities Gold, and PC Tools. None of these are now published.

== PC Tools ==
PC Tools
- Editor: Ian Barker
- Categories: Computer magazines
- Frequency: Every 6 weeks
- Final issue: February 2010
- Company: Magnesium Media
- Country: United Kingdom
- Language: English
- Website: www.magnesiummedia.com
- ISSN: 1477-514X

PC Tools was published every six weeks and edited by Ian Barker. Each issue of PC Tools focused on a different area of personal computer usage. The coverdisc provided a selection of programs related to the issue's theme, and allowed users to follow the guides in the magazine. PC Tools ceased publishing in February 2010, after eight years in production.
