= BLAST (protocol) =

Communications protocol created in the 1980s

BLAST (Blocked Asynchronous Transmission), like XMODEM and Kermit, is a communications protocol designed for file transfer over asynchronous communication ports and dial-up modems that achieved a significant degree of popularity during the 1980s. Reflecting its status as a de facto standard for such transfers, BLAST, along with XMODEM, was briefly under official consideration by ANSI in the mid-80s as part of that organization's ultimately futile attempt to establish a single de jure standard.

== Overview ==
BLAST grew out of the mission-critical experience of providing air pollution telemetry within the dial-up communications environment of the petroleum belt of southern Louisiana and Texas, with not only noisy telephone lines but also unexpected satellite hops to remote locations. As such, BLAST was the only asynchronous protocol to have entered the 1980s computing arena with all of the following features:

- bit-oriented data encoding
- CRC (cyclic redundancy check) error detection
- a sliding window block transmission scheme
- selective retransmission of corrupted blocks
- simultaneous bi-directional data transfer

BLAST, at the time, gained a reputation as the protocol having the best combination of speed and reliability in its class.

Our tests showed that when connected to a host running BLAST, MacBLAST provides the most error-free and fastest file transfers we've yet seen ... MacBLAST to BLAST never lost data and never blew a connection in our tests.

— Don Crabb, "MacBLAST carves a place for itself in communications applications", MacWEEK (February 21, 1989)

== History ==
The idea for the BLAST product belongs to Paul Charbonnet, Jr., a former Data General salesman. Its original version was designed and implemented for the Data General line of Nova minicomputers by G. W. Smith, a former BorgWarner Research Center systems engineer who, having developed a basic "ack-nak" protocol for the aforesaid telemetry application, now created an entirely new protocol with all of the above-mentioned features, and for which he devised the "BLAST" acronym.

This work was performed under contract to AMP Incorporated, of Baton Rouge, LA. However, it was another Baton Rouge company, Communications Research Group (CRG), which was to successfully commercialize the BLAST protocol, and which was also to employ Charbonnet and Smith as, respectively, Sales Director and Vice-president of Research and Development.

On the downside, BLAST was criticized by ZMODEM developer Chuck Forsberg because of its proprietary nature, making it "tightly bound to the fortunes of [its supplier]".

== Communications Research Group ==
Communications Research Group (CRG) was a Baton Rouge, Louisiana based company which became a major international vendor of data communications software during the 1980s, and which software had the BLAST protocol at its core.

As representative of one of CRG's mature products, the BLAST-II file transfer software was distinguished by its wide range of features. Beyond supporting the BLAST protocol, it enabled use of the competing XMODEM, encrypted and transmitted data using Secure Sockets Layer (SSL), and had "versions for about a hundred different micros, minis, and mainframes". Like Columbia University's Kermit software, CRG's BLAST-II also provided a scripting language.

CRG was recognized as one of the 100 largest microcomputer software companies in the United States, and it was ultimately acquired by modem manufacturer USRobotics in 1990, and which company continued to develop and sell BLAST products.

== See also ==
- Kermit (protocol)
- XMODEM
- ZMODEM
