= List of ITU-T V-series recommendations =

The ITU-T V-Series Recommendations on Data communication over the telephone network specify the protocols that govern approved modem communication standards and interfaces.

Note: the bis and ter suffixes are ITU-T standard designators of successive iterations of a standard (bis and ter are the Latin words for "twice" and "thrice").

== General standards ==
Applies to V.1–V.9

- V.1 is an ITU-T recommendation, entitled Equivalence between binary notation symbols and the significant conditions of a two-condition code.
- V.2 is an ITU-T recommendation, approved in November 1988, titled Power levels for data transmission over telephone lines.
- V.4 is an ITU-T recommendation, approved in November 1988, titled General structure of signals of International Alphabet No. 5 code for character oriented data transmission over public telephone networks.
- V.5 was an ITU-T recommendation, approved in November 1988, titled Standardization of data signalling rates for synchronous data transmission in the general switched telephone network. It has since been withdrawn.
- V.6 was an ITU-T recommendation, approved in November 1988, titled Standardization of data signalling rates for synchronous data transmission on leased telephone-type circuits. It has since been withdrawn.
- V.7 is an ITU-T recommendation, approved in November 1988, titled Definitions of terms concerning data communication over the telephone network.
- V.8 is an ITU-T recommendation, first approved in September 1994, titled Procedures for starting sessions of data transmission over the public switched telephone network. It has been superseded three times. The current version was approved in November 2000.
  - V.8bis is an ITU-T recommendation, first approved in August 1996, titled Procedures for the identification and selection of common modes of operation between data circuit-terminating equipments (DCEs) and between data terminal equipments (DTEs) over the public switched telephone network and on leased point-to-point telephone-type circuits. It has been superseded twice. The current version was approved in November 2000.

== Interfaces and voiceband modems ==
Applies to V.10–V.34

- V.10 is an ITU-T recommendation, first agreed in 1976, for unbalanced electrical circuits for data communication at up to 100 kbit/s. It can interwork with V.28, provided it is not exposed to signals greater than 12 volts. Used with the 37-pin ISO 4902 connector, it is compatible with EIA RS-423.
- V.11 is an ITU-T recommendation, first agreed in 1976, for balanced electrical circuits for data communication at up to 10 Mbit/s. Used with the 37-pin ISO 4902 connector ("DC-37"), it is compatible with EIA-422. The 15-pin ISO 4903 connector ("DA-15") is recommended for data network interface.
- V.17 is an ITU-T recommendation for a fax modem using TCM at 12 and 14.4 kbit/s.
- V.18 is an ITU-T recommendation for operation and interworking of text telephone devices
- V.21 is an ITU-T recommendation for full-duplex communication between two analogue dial-up modems using audio frequency-shift keying modulation at 300 baud to carry digital data at 300 bit/s. It is a variant of the original Bell 103 modulation format.
- V.22 is an ITU-T recommendation for full-duplex communication between two analogue dial-up modems using PSK modulation at 600 baud to carry data at 1200 or 600 bit/s. It is a variant of the Bell 212A modulation format.
  - V.22bis is an ITU-T recommendation extending V.22 with a faster rate using QAM at 600 baud to carry digital data at 2400 or 1200 bit/s. The 1200 bit/s mode is compatible with V.22.
- V.23 is an ITU-T recommendation for half-duplex communication between two analogue dial-up modems using FSK modulation at up to 600 or 1200 baud to carry digital data at up to 600 or 1200 bit/s respectively. An optional 75 baud reverse channel carries 75 bit/s.
- V.24 is referenced as RS-232 which also includes V.28.
- V.25ter see V.250
- V.27ter is an ITU-T recommendation for a half-duplex modem, allowing 2400 and 4800 bit/s (PSK modulation).
- V.28 is an ITU-T recommendation defining the electrical characteristics for unbalanced double-current interchange circuits.
- V.29 is an ITU-T recommendation for a modem, allowing 4.8 kbit/s, 7.2 kbit/s and 9.6 kbit/s transfer modes (PSK and QAM modulations).
- V.32 (11/88) is an ITU-T recommendation for a modem operating as full-duplex on a four-wire circuit, or half-duplex on a two-wire circuit, allowing bidirectional data transfer at either 9.6 kbit/s or 4.8 kbit/s at a symbol rate of 2,400 baud instead of the 600 baud of the V.22 standards.
  - V.32bis (02/91) is an ITU-T recommendation for a modem, allowing up to 14.4 kbit/s bidirectional data transfer. Other additional defined data transfer rates are 12.0 kbit/s, 9.6 kbit/s, 7.2 kbit/s, and 4.8 kbit/s. The standard was extended by several modem manufacturers to allow bidirectional data transfer rates of 19.2 kbit/s, but never ratified as a V.32ter standard. These non-ITU-T standard modems were often referred to as "V.32terbo" modems.
- V.33 is an ITU-T recommendation for a modem operating as full-duplex on a four-wire point-to-point leased line allowing bidirectional data transfer at either 14.4 kbit/s.
- V.34 (09/94) is an ITU-T recommendation (superseded) for a modem, allowing up to 28.8 kbit/s bidirectional data transfer using TCM modulation. Other additional defined data transfer rates are 24.0 kbit/s and 19.2 kbit/s as well as all the permitted V.32 and V.32bis rates. Additionally, V.34 modems employ shell mapping as shaping code to reduce the transmit power.
  - V.34 (10/96) is an updated ITU-T recommendation for a modem, building on the V.34 standard but allowing up to 33.6 kbit/s bidirectional data transfer. Other additional defined data transfer rates are 31.2 kbit/s, as well as all the permitted V.34 rates. Modems implementing this standard were often marketed under the moniker V.34+.
  - V.34 (02/98) commonly rendered as V.34bis, is a further update to V.34 which corrected some errata in the original 1996 document.

=== Ad hoc standards ===
In order to gain first-mover advantage, many modem companies introduced models based on upcoming V-series standards before they reached final ratification. In other cases, companies introduced non-standard systems but gave them ITU-like names.

- V.32terbo, or V.32ter for short, was a 19.2 kbit/s standard introduced by AT&T Paradyne. It was based on V.32bis and did little other than increase the data rate. V.32ter is compatible with V.32bis at speeds of 14.4 kbit/s and lower, but it is not compatible with V.34 at 19.2.
- V.FC, short for V.Fast Class and sometimes referred to as V.FAST, was developed by Hayes and Rockwell to introduce a 28.8 kbit/s standard while the V.34 efforts dragged on. V.FC was not compatible with V.34, although most V.34 modems could support V.FC, notably, those using Rockwell chipsets.

== Wideband modems ==
Applies to V.35–V.39

- V.35 is an ITU-T standard located on layer 1 on the OSI model. Max speed is 2 Mbit/s and synchronous only. Withdrawn ITU-T recommendation for 48 kbit/s data transmission over wideband circuits. The physical and electrical characteristics of this interface are now specified in ITU-T recommendation V.11.
- V.36 is an ITU-T standard located on layer 2 on the OSI model called Modems For Synchronous Data Transmission Using 60–108 kHz Group Band Circuits.

== Error control and data compression ==
Applies to V.40–V.49

- V.41 is a code-independent error control system. It defines the ITU-T standard CRC-16 polynomial as x^{16} + x^{12} + x^{5} + 1
- V.42 is an error correction protocol. The receiver uses it to immediately request re-transmission of any lost data packets. However, it does not guarantee how quickly the error-free data will be delivered to the receiving end. V.42 is generally included in dialup modems. It also defines the ITU-T standard CRC-32 polynomial as x^{32}+x^{26}+x^{23}+x^{22}+x^{16}+x^{12}+x^{11}+x^{10}+x^{8}+x^{7}+x^{5}+x^{4}+x^{2}+x+1, and includes the LAPM framing protocol.
  - V.42bis, also an adaptive data compression standard, is based on the Lempel Ziv dynamic dictionary approach, and may go to "transparent mode," in which data is transmitted uncompressed. The specific algorithm is "BTLZ" (British Telecom Lempel Ziv), which was developed by Alan Clark (then with BT).
- V.44 is based on LZJH (Lempel–Ziv–Jeff–Heath) adaptive data compression developed by Hughes Electronics for its DirecPC satellite Internet, and incorporated into the v.92 dial-up modem standard. V.44 offers somewhat better compression performance for certain types of data than the V.42bis standard. On average, it achieves 15% greater throughput. For instance, a 53.3 kbit/s connection with V.44 can transmit up to 53.3×6 = 320 kbit/s using pure text. In reality, the overall data rate rarely exceeds 3:1 compression (~150 kbit/s). The compression tends to get better and worse over time due to noise on the line, or due to the transfer of already-compressed files (ZIP files, JPEG images, MP3 audio, MPEG video). At some points the modem will be sending compressed files at 53 kbit/s, uncompressed files at 160 kbit/s, and pure text at 320 kbit/s, or any value in between.

== Simultaneous transmission of data and other signals ==
Applies to V.60–V.99

- V.61 Analog Simultaneous Voice and Data (ASVD)
- V.70 Digital Simultaneous Voice and Data (DSVD)
- V.80: videoconferencing. It is generally compatibilized with H.324 standard point-to-point video telephony over regular phone lines.
- V.90 is an ITU-T recommendation for a modem, allowing 56 kbit/s digital download and 33.6 kbit/s analog upload. It replaced two vendor standards (K56flex and X2) and was designed to allow modems from both prior standards to be flash upgraded to support it. It is also known as V.Last as it was anticipated to be the last standard for modems operating near the channel capacity of POTS lines to be developed. V.90 is generally used in concert with the V.42bis compression standard.
- V.91: A digital modem operating at data signalling rates of up to 64 000 bit/s for use on a four-wire circuit switched connection and on leased point-to-point four-wire digital circuits, published in 1999
- V.92 is an ITU-T recommendation, titled Enhancements to Recommendation V.90, that establishes a modem standard allowing 56 kbit/s download, 48 kbit/s upload rates, and the new V.44 compression method. It is intended to succeed the V.90 standards. With V.92, PCM is used for both the upstream and downstream connections; previously 56K modems only used PCM for downstream data.

== Interworking with other networks ==
Applies to V.100–V.199

- V.110 is an ITU-T recommendation for using terminal adaptor functions for the connection of terminals having interfaces conforming to V-series to the ISDN.
- V.120 is an alternative to V.110 based on the LAPD protocol.
- V.150.1 is an ITU-T recommendation for using a modem over IP networks.
- V.152 is an ITU-T recommendation for using voice-band data over IP networks.

== Interface layer specifications for data communication ==
Applies to V.200–V.249

- V.230 is an ITU-T recommendation, approved in November 1988, titled General data communications interface layer 1 specification.

== Control procedures ==
Applies to V.250–V.299

- V.250, originally known as V.25ter, is an ITU-T recommendation for serial asynchronous automatic dialing and control.

== Digital circuit modems ==
Applies to V.300–V.399

- V.300 is an ITU-T recommendation, first approved in January 1997, titled A 128 (144) kbit/s data circuit-terminating equipment standardized for use on digital point-to-point leased circuits.

== See also ==
- Microcom Networking Protocols (MNP1 to 10)
- List of interface bit rates
