= The Three Musketeers (disambiguation) =

The Three Musketeers is an 1844 novel by Alexandre Dumas. It may also refer to:

== Based on the Dumas novel or its sequels ==
=== Film ===
- The Three Musketeers in film, a list of the various film adaptations of the novel
  - The Three Musketeers (1921 film), a silent film starring Douglas Fairbanks, Léon Bary, Eugene Pallette and George Siegmann, produced by Douglas Fairbanks
  - The Three Musketeers (1973 animated film), a television special produced by Hanna-Barbera Productions
  - The Three Musketeers (1973 live-action film), starring Michael York, Charlton Heston and Raquel Welch
  - The Three Musketeers (1993 film), a 1993 Austrian-American action-adventure comedy film produced by Walt Disney Pictures
  - Mickey, Donald, Goofy: The Three Musketeers, a 2004 animated Disney comedy film
  - The Three Musketeers (2011 film), a 2011 American/German romantic action-adventure film
  - The Three Musketeers (2013 film), a 2013 Russian film also aired as a television miniseries
  - The Three Musketeers: D'Artagnan, a 2023 film, first of two parts
  - The Three Musketeers: Milady, a 2023 film, second of two parts

=== TV series ===
- The Three Musketeers (1966 TV series), a 1966 British television serial produced by the BBC for BBC One
- The Three Musketeers (American TV series), a 1968–1969 American animated television series produced by Hanna-Barbera Productions for NBC
- The Three Musketeers Anime, a 1987 Japanese animated television series broadcast on NHK
- The Three Musketeers (2009 TV series), a 2009–2010 Japanese puppetry television series broadcast on NHK
- The Three Musketeers (2013 film), a 2013 Russian film also aired as a television miniseries
- The Three Musketeers (South Korean TV series), a 2014 South Korean television series
- The Musketeers, a 2014 BBC historical-action drama series

=== Stage ===
- The Three Musketeers (musical), a musical first performed in 1928
- 3 Musketiers, a 2003 Dutch musical, also known as 3 Musketiere (German), 3 Musketeers (English) and A 3 Testőr (Hungarian)

== Games ==
- Three musketeers (game), a board game published in 1969
- The Three Musketeers (1987 video game), a 1987 game based on the novel
- The Three Musketeers (2006 video game), a Swedish game based on the novel
  - The Three Musketeers: One for All!, a 2009 WiiWare version of the Swedish game

== Groups ==
- The Three Musketeers (Supreme Court), the nickname of Justices Louis Brandeis, Benjamin Cardozo and Harlan Fiske Stone during the 1930s
- The Three Musketeers (Studebaker engineers), the nickname given to three young engineers who started collaborative partnership at Studebaker in 1914
- The Three Musketeers (professional wrestling), nickname for Japanese wrestlers Shinya Hashimoto, Masahiro Chono, and Keiji Mutoh

== Other uses ==
- "The Three Musketeers", eleventh episode in 2009 of the American television series Jonas
- "The Three Musketeers" (short story), an 1888 short story by Rudyard Kipling
- Three Musketeers, a 1939 novel by Tiffany Thayer
- 3 Musketeers (chocolate bar), a chocolate candy bar released in 1932
- "3 Musketeers", a 2020 single by ppcocaine

== See also ==
- The Three Mouseketeers, a comic book series published by DC Comics
- Dogtanian and the Three Muskehounds, a 1981 Japanese animation based on Dumas' story
- Musketeer (disambiguation)
- Revenge of the Musketeers
- The Four Musketeers (disambiguation)
- The Three Musketeers of the Air, a 1928 non-fiction book by Hermann Köhl, James Fitzmaurice and Ehrenfried Günther Freiherr von Hünefeld
- The Three Musketeers in Africa, a 1940 Hungarian novel by Jenő Rejtő
- The Three Musketeers of the West, a 1973 Italian spaghetti Western-comedy film
- The Three Mesquiteers, a series of 51 western B-movies released between 1936 and 1943
