= Musketeer (disambiguation) =

A musketeer is an early-modern type of infantry soldier.

Musketeer or Musketeers may also refer to:

== Arts ==
- The Musketeers (film), a 1961 Danish film
- The Musketeer, a 2001 American film
- The Musketeers, a 2014 BBC television series

== Other uses ==
- Musketeers (synchronized skating team)
- Beechcraft Musketeer, a trainer aircraft
- Operation Musketeer (disambiguation)
- Xavier Musketeers, the sports teams of Xavier University in the United States
- Fans of Elon Musk, usually in a pejorative sense
- Musketeers (board game), published 1985

== See also ==
- Musket
- The Three Musketeers (disambiguation)
- The Four Musketeers
- Revenge of the Musketeers
- Mouseketeer, a person who is a cast member of the television series The Mickey Mouse Club; may also refer to:
  - Three Blind Mouseketeers, a 1936 Silly Symphonies cartoon
  - The Three Mouseketeers, a comic book series published by DC Comics
  - The Two Mouseketeers, a 1952 Tom and Jerry cartoon
