= Flying Tigers: Shadows Over China =

2017 combat flight simulation video game

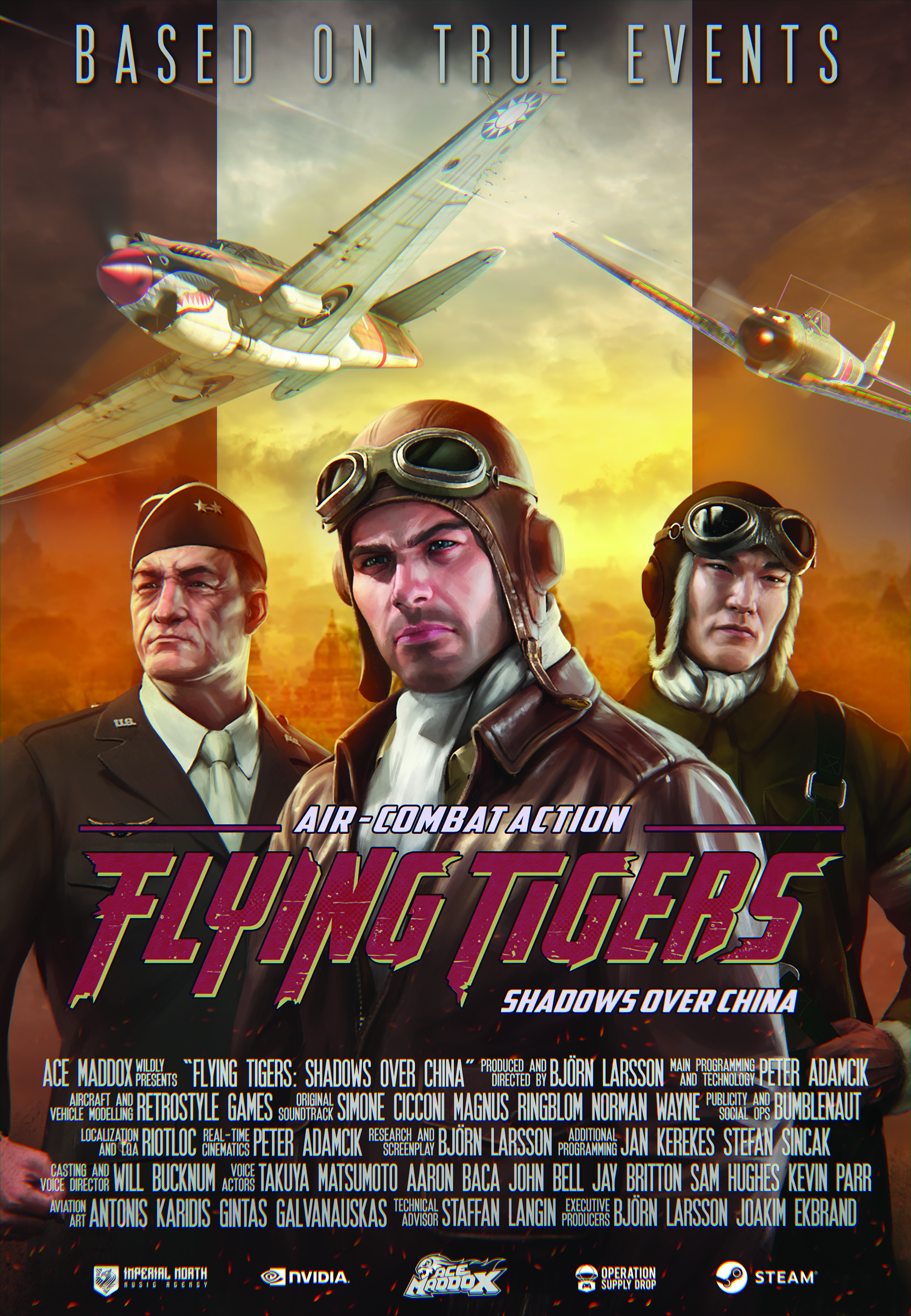
- Game poster
- Developer: Ace Maddox
- Publisher: Ace Maddox
- Director: Björn Larsson
- Producer: Björn Larsson
- Programmer: Peter Adamčík
- Writer: Björn Larsson
- Composers: Simone Cicconi; Magnus Ringblom
- Platforms: Microsoft Windows; Xbox One
- Release: Microsoft Windows; 29 May 2017; Xbox One; 12 January 2018
- Genres: Action-adventure, combat flight simulation
- Modes: Single-player, multiplayer

Flying Tigers: Shadows Over China is a combat flight simulation game developed and published by Ace Maddox. It was released for Microsoft Windows in May 2017 and for Xbox One in January 2018. The game is based on the Flying Tigers, a volunteer squadron that defended China against Japan in World War II. The game is presented through both first and third-person perspectives. The single-player campaign features several missions for players to complete. The multiplayer component allows up to 16 people to engage in both cooperative and competitive gameplay.

For the game's release, Ace Maddox provided a special edition version of the game featuring the soundtrack and downloadable content. The game received mixed reviews from critics, who generally approved of the gameplay and controls but were divided on the narrative and technical performance.

== Gameplay ==
Flying Tigers: Shadows Over China is a combat flight simulation game that is played from a first or third-person perspective. Players assume control of a member of the Flying Tigers, a volunteer squadron that was recruited by the Chinese troops to help fight against Japan during World War II. The game focuses on the key battles of the China Burma India Theater and features missions based on real historical battles such as Battle of the Salween Gorge, Invasion of Malaya, and the Bombing of Rangoon.

The single-player campaign includes a total of 12 missions with several objectives in each, allowing players to take on the role of fighters, bombers, reconnaissance soldiers, gunners, and rescue staff. Objectives vary from bombing runs on enemy airfields, dropping torpedoes on ships, or strafing ground targets. Shooting and destroying targets is an essential mechanic in the game. Missions also focus on battle strategy. The single-player component also features several other modes: Dogfight, wherein players choose a plane, location, and a number of enemies to battle against; Free Flight, which allows the player to fly freely without any objectives; and Challenge Mode features five missions with specific objectives including survival, capture the flag, and destroying all enemies.

The online multiplayer mode for Flying Tigers allows up to 16 players to compete cooperatively and competitively. The multiplayer component features five game modes, including: Dogfight, which can be played as a free for all deathmatch or a team deathmatch; Rocket Battle, where players, either cooperatively or competitively, have their planes equipped with rockets that can kill in one shot; and Flagbusters, a capture the flag game type.

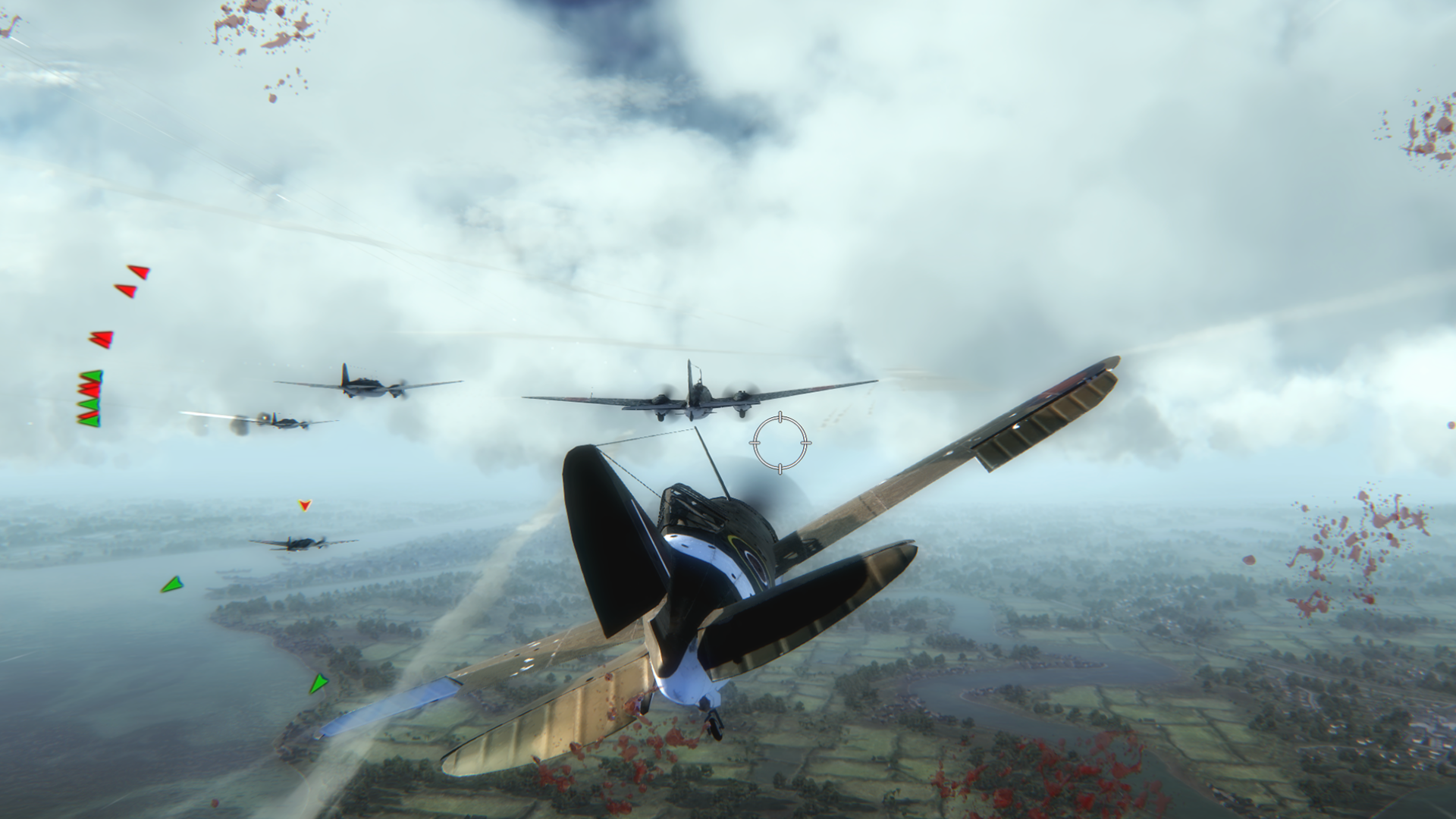
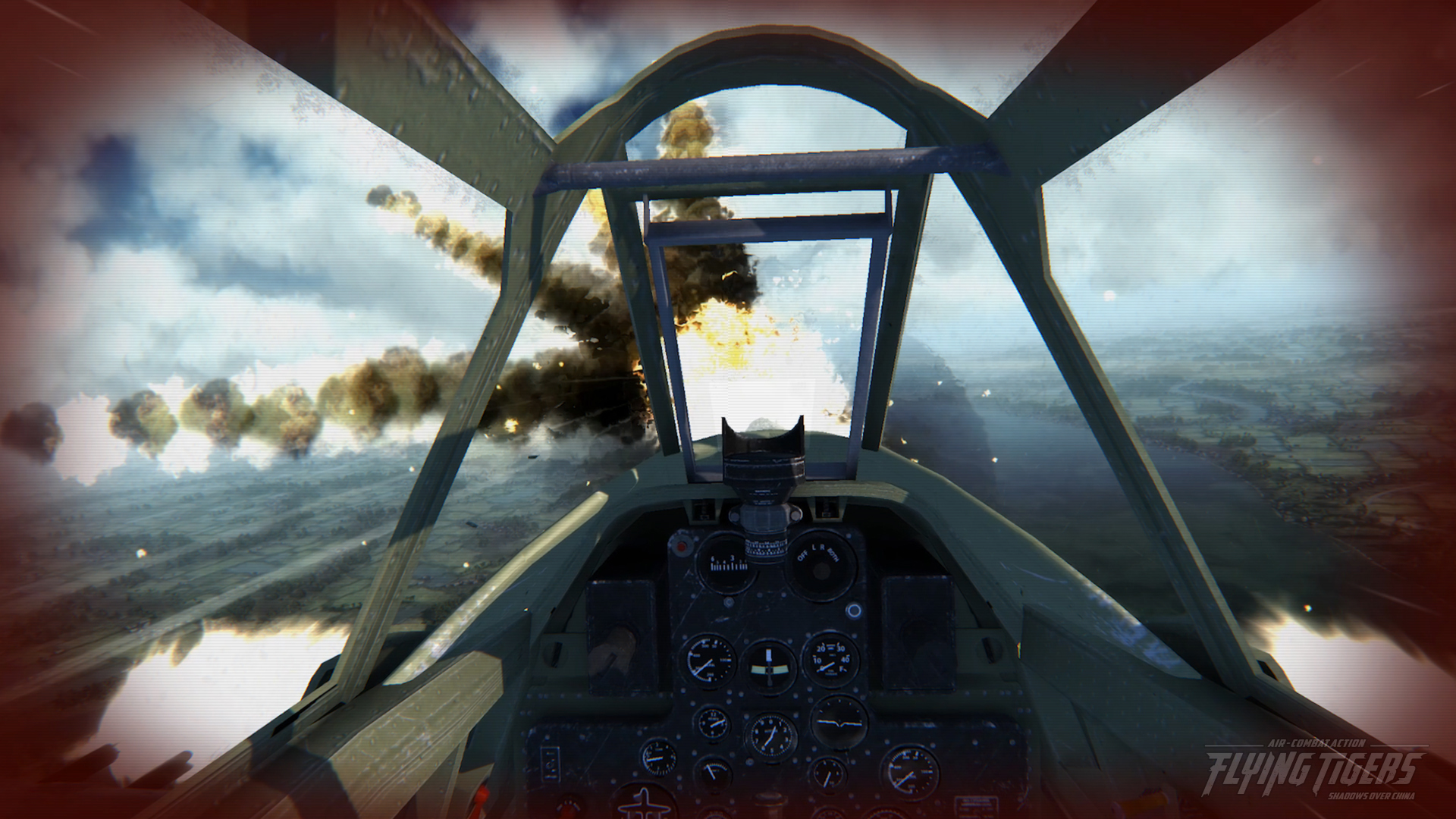
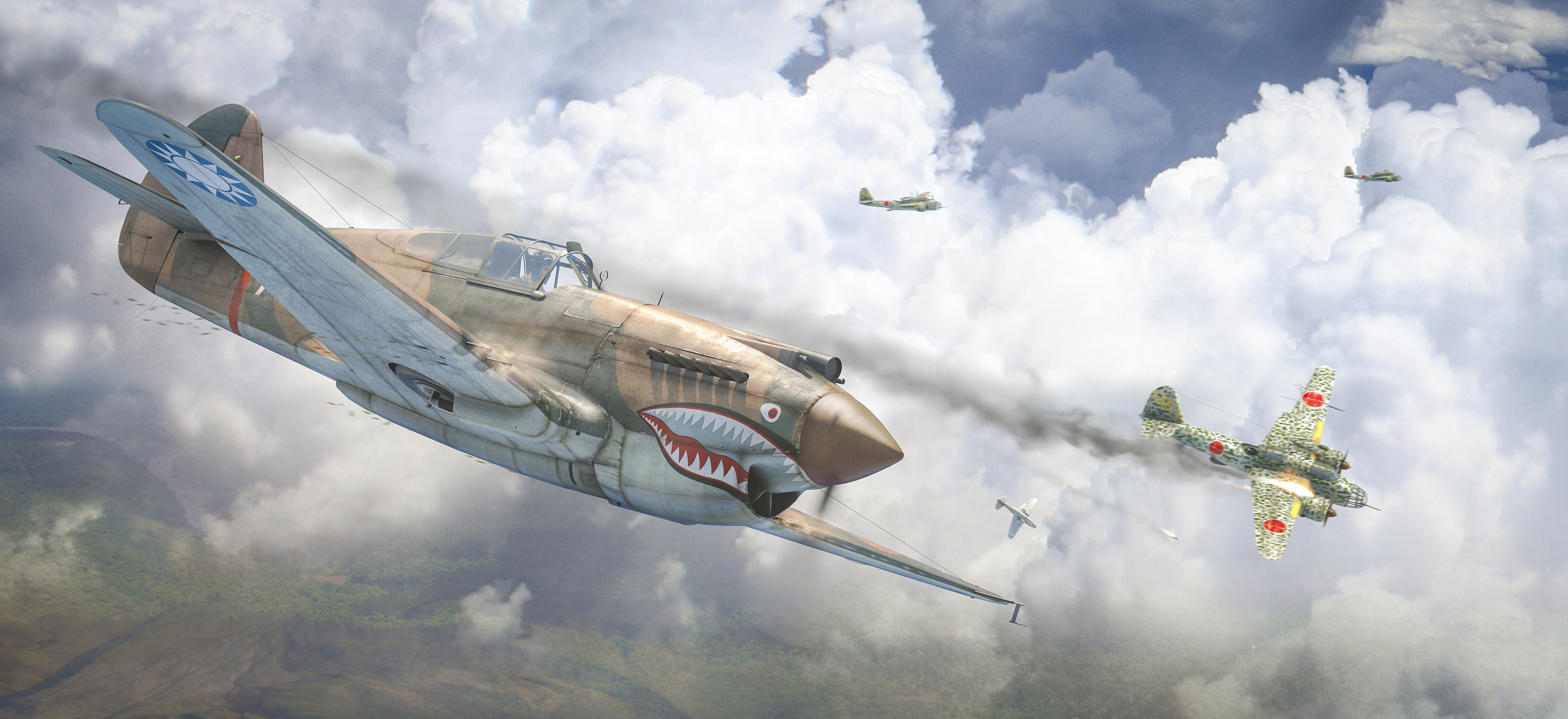
The player assumes control of several historic aircraft during the Attack on Pearl Harbor. Gameplay can be viewed from different perspectives.

== Release ==
Ace Maddox first revealed Flying Tigers: Shadows Over China with a trailer on 27 March 2015. The game launched through early access on Steam on 19 August 2015. The full game was released for Microsoft Windows on 29 May 2017. The deluxe edition includes the game's soundtrack and downloadable content such as the Paradise Island expansion and a new map and aircraft. In October 2017, Ace Maddox revealed that the game would be released for Xbox One; it launched through the Xbox Games Store on 12 January 2018. The game's soundtrack was published on streaming platforms on 10 January 2019.

== Reception ==
Reception

Aggregate score
Aggregator	Score
Metacritic	67/100

Review scores
Publication	Score
Generación Xbox	7.5/10
IGN Spain	6/10
TheXboxHub	3/5
TrueAchievements	3/5
Xbox Addict	6.7/10
Xbox Tavern	7.8/10

Flying Tigers: Shadows Over China received "mixed or average reviews", according to review aggregator Metacritic. John Walker of Rock, Paper, Shotgun noted that the game reminded him of Attack on Pearl Harbor (2007), also from director Björn Larsson. Javier Artero of IGN Spain felt that the game could only be recommended for fans of other aerial combat games. By January 2019, Ace Maddox stated that 78,750 flight hours had been played on Xbox One, equivalent to nine years.

The gameplay and controls received generally positive comments. David Szlavik of Clubit praised the difficulty of the game's dogfights. Ogley of TrueAchievements appreciated the variety of control schemes for the different types of aircraft. Fern of Keen Gamer enjoyed the satisfaction of dropping bombs, but criticised the game's control scheme. Rock, Paper, Shotgun's Walker found the game's mouse and keyboard setup to be more intuitive than a controller.

The game's campaign missions received mixed reactions, with some critics praising the concept and historical influence but criticising its repetitiveness. Joe Pepek of Xbox Tavern praised the game's campaign, noting that it "alone is worth the price of admission, despite its short length". Andrew Ogley of TrueAchievements lauded the game's length and intensity of the missions. IGN Spain's Artero found the game's narrative entertaining, despite hoping for more customization. Keen Gamer's Austin Fern commended the game's end-mission briefings comparing the missions to the real events, but noted that the characters and story did not excel. Walker of Rock, Paper, Shotgun appreciated some of the game modes, but felt that the "silly arcade missions" interfered with the tone of historical accuracy; Adem Dileva of XboxAddict echoed a similar sentiment, describing the historical influence as "fascinating" but criticising the game's execution. Carlos Santuana of TheXboxHub condemned the repetition of the missions, noting that they "fail to bring any real enjoyment".

Reviewers were critical of the game's graphics and technical performance, though Keen Gamer's lauded the designs of the planes. Ogley of TrueAchievements praised the environmental graphics, though noted some issues with the designs of the enemy forces. Rock, Paper, Shotgun's Walker criticised the game's graphics, describing them as "blocky and poor". Artero of IGN Spain noted some frame rate issues, particularly while aiming. Pepek of Xbox Tavern noticed some camera issues during combat and lag during multiplayer matches. Desirée Clary of Generación Xbox felt that the game's performance issues were forgivable considering the developer's limited budget.
