= Robinson Technologies =

Japanese video game developer

Robinson Technologies is a Japanese video game developer founded by Seth Robinson. The company produced the BBS door games Legend of the Red Dragon, Planets: The Exploration of Space and Growtopia, an experimental multiplayer creative sandbox created as a collaboration with Hamumu Software, released in 2013 for iOS, Android, Microsoft Windows, and macOS.

== History ==
=== The BBS era ===
In 1989, Seth Robinson created a game that he called Legend of the Red Dragon, or LORD, in an effort to attract new users to his Amiga-based BBS that he ran at the time. He was only 14 years old at the time. He later allowed others to port the game to other operating systems and BBS platforms.

The game exemplified how simple a game could be while still being fun. It is a text-based menu-driven fighting game, allowing players to take on the role of a potential dragon-slayer. It featured multiplayer options if its BBS host had multiple nodes (or phone lines). The gameplay style that it featured was in many ways a predecessor to the MMORPG genre. The game would later feature a form of graphical menus, created and displayed by RIPTerm.

Another feature of the game was In Game Modules or IGMs. These were little add-ons to the game, allowing for expansion. IGMs could be written by anyone and allowed for a lot of gameplay to be added on. Some IGMs even allowed "mischievous" game play, almost allowing players to cheat. Robinson only released a single IGM of his own, called Barak's House.

Shortly afterwards, Robinson released a game called Planets: The Exploration of Space. Commonly referred to as Planets: TEOS, it was a space trading game that had players flying to various kinds of planets, buying, selling, and trading items in order to make money. The game allowed fights that were very similar in style to LORD, allowing players to attack others when they were offline. Players could also attack planets in order to take control of them. Robinson describes the game as "kind of like LORD mixed with Tradewars".

The game featured two sides, the Alliance and the Maraken. Players could join and fight for either side. Players could own planets for whichever side they belonged to. However, they could also play independently and start their own "guilds" called cartels. The game had a notable Star Trek influence, including references to the Borg and characters from different Star Trek shows.

Planets: TEOS also featured IGMs, the major difference being that players had to travel to a particular planet to enter into that IGM. Robinson only released one TEOS IGM of his own, called "Landfill", which was a Tetris clone.

In various releases of Planets: TEOS, Robinson advertised a new game he had been working on. This game, New World, would never see release due to reasons that were never made public. Instead, another of Robinson's games inherited the name, Legend of the Red Dragon II: New World. Fans wanted a new game from Robinson and wanted New World as well, so he released the official sequel to his original hit, Legend of the Red Dragon.

This game is completely different than the original Red Dragon. Instead of a text-based menu concept, the game had an ANSI-based graphical map concept. Players controlled a smiley face-like character that could roam around, much like modern MMORPGs. The game was never as successful as the original Red Dragon, but it did gather a cult following.

Eventually, Robinson sold the rights to the three BBS games to Metropolis Gameport in 1998.

==== List of RTSoft BBS Door games and programs ====
- Legend of the Red Dragon
  - Barak's House (a LORD IGM)
- Planets: The Exploration of Space (or simply Planets: TEOS)
  - Landfill (TEOS In Game Module Tetris clone)
- Legend of the Red Dragon II: New World
- RTReader (BBS door that ran from a scripting language)
- BradyBunch Adventure (multiplayer .DLL for MBBS/Worldgroup)
- Tournament LORD (MBBS/Worldgroup .DLL port)

=== The PC era ===
In 1997, Robinson Technologies released an adventure/RPG title by the name of Dink Smallwood. This was an effort made by Seth Robinson to move away from BBS door games and into something more profitable. The title featured an isometric view and had a comedic focus.

In an attempt to keep the game's player-base active longer, Robinson took the idea of IGMs from Legend of the Red Dragon and created "D-Mods", an add-on feature where players could create their own adventure for others to explore. Anyone could create D-Mods and distribute them as they wished.

On 17 October 1999, Robinson Technologies released the game to the public for free, and now it can be downloaded without charge from their website. On 16 December 2011, a new version of Dink Smallwood called Dink Smallwood HD was released for iPhone, iPad, Android, Windows XP/Vista/7, webOS, and Mac OS X.

After Dink Smallwood, Robinson worked on many programs, releasing most of them on the company website. Notable releases include Teenage Lawnmower, Dungeon Scroll and Funeral Quest. He also worked on games for other companies like the Opening Weekend series for The Learning Company and developed several Flash games for various websites.

==== List of RTSoft PC games and programs ====
- Dink Smallwood (WIN95 RPG; published by Iridon Interactive)
  - Mystery Island (a Dink module released as a free add-on)
- Opening Weekend: Varmit Season (published by The Learning Company)
- Opening Weekend: Deer Season (published by The Learning Company)
- Opening Weekend: Grizzly Season (published by The Learning Company)
- Opening Weekend: Bear Season (published by The Learning Company)
- Teenage Lawnmower
- Dungeon Scroll
- Funeral Quest (Flash game)

==== File formats created ====
- RTTX( Robinson Technologies Texture File ) Image format, currently used within Growtopia game.

=== The mobile era ===
Robinson Technologies started developing games for the mobile device market in the early 2000s. They developed games for the Pocket PC platform, such as a game designed by his wife, Akiko Robinson, called Reckless Thief. The company made the leap to the smartphone market after 2007.

==== List of RTSoft mobile games and programs ====
- Trophy Whitetail PDA (MachineWorks Northwest; Pocket PC)
- Grizzly PDA (MachineWorks Northwest; Pocket PC)
- ProCar Racing (MachineWorks Northwest; Pocket PC)
- Akiko Robinson's Reckless Thief (Pocket PC)
- Duke Nukem Mobile (MachineWorks Northwest; BREW)
- T-rexx Hunter: Terror From The Past (MachineWorks Northwest; BREW)
- Duke Nukem Mobile (3D) (MachineWorks Northwest; Tapwave Zodiac)
- Stargate SG-1 (MachineWorks Northwest; BREW)
- Duke Nukem Mobile 3D (MachineWorks Northwest; BREW)
- T-REXX Hunter 3D (MachineWorks Northwest; BREW)
- Dungeon Scroll
- Tanked
- Mind Wall
- Blip Arcade
- Growtopia
