= Drac =

Drac (which means dragon or devil in some languages), Dracs or DRAC may refer to:

== Geography ==
- Drac (river), France, a tributary of the Isère
- Drac County, a county of the Kingdom of Serbia from 1912 to 1913
- Durrës, a city and a municipality in Albania, which is known as Drač in the Serbo-Croatian languages
- Drač, Podgorica, a neighborhood of Podgorica, Montenegro

== DRAC ==
- DRAC (Dynamic Relay Authorization Control), a daemon that dynamically updates a relay authorization map for sendmail
- Dell DRAC (Dell Remote Access Controller), a remote-access card available in many models of Dell servers
- Dongfeng Renault Automobile Company, a Chinese joint venture between car manufacturers Dongfeng and Renault
- Direction régionale des affaires culturelles, a heritage service in one of each of the regions of France
- Badalona Dracs, an American-football team based in Badalona, Catalonia, Spain

== Other uses ==
- Drac, abbreviation for the orchid genus Dracula
- Drac, nickname of the trans-Neptunian object (528219) 2008 KV42
- Dracs, an alien species in Barry B. Longyear's The Enemy Papers novel trilogy
- Drac, one of the title characters of Dracula Twins, a video game
- Drac (legendary creature), shape-shifting spirit in European folklore.
- Marc Hicks ("Drac"), co-founder and guitarist of the now-defunct band Slave
- Ernest Ochieno (“Drac”), Afro House DJ and producer
