= Legend of the Red Dragon =

1989 video game

- Developer: Robinson Technologies
- Platforms: MS-DOS; Windows; OS/2
- Release: 1989
- Genre: Role-playing
- Mode: Multiplayer

Legend of the Red Dragon (LORD) is a text-based, online role-playing video game released in 1989 by Robinson Technologies. LORD is one of the best known door games. The player's goal is to improve their skills in order to defeat the Red Dragon which has been attacking the village. The software runs on MS-DOS, Windows, and OS/2. The game was sold to and is currently owned by Metropolis Gameport.

== History ==
LORD was created by Seth Robinson, founder of Robinson Technologies, and was maintained by Michael Preslar. Robinson began to write LORD in Pascal to run on his bulletin board system. As he did not have access to other door games such as Trade Wars, he needed something that would occasionally bring people back to the BBS. The first version of LORD only featured the chatting and flirting systems. Over time, Robinson incorporated features that he had seen work well in other games: for example, the restricted number of turns per day, and the concept of random events. Eventually LORD became a mixture of action and romance.

LORD was initially only intended to run on his own BBS, but Robinson eventually received offers from users who wanted to run it on other systems. After the first sale, word-of-mouth advertising increased its popularity.

LORD was a successful game, and by 1993 many BBSs had active communities of players. Over the next few years, MUDs began to overtake BBS door games as the multiplayer online format of choice; in 1998, with the release of v4.00a, Robinson sold the game and its sequel to Metropolis Gameport.

On January 8, 2001, Metropolis Gameport contracted Michael Preslar to continue the game's development. As of 2026, Gameport lists v4.07 (06/07/2006), with no further updates. On the Lord blog, Preslar stated he believed the game was abandoned, yet without permission from Gameport, he cannot release new versions.

== Gameplay ==
The premise of LORD is that a red dragon is wreaking havoc in a town where the player has recently arrived. Multiple players compete over a period of weeks to advance their skills and to kill the dragon. In order to achieve this goal, players must face combat to gain experience. Once they have gained enough experience, they must face their master at Turgon's Warrior Training and advance in skill level. Advancement increases the players fighting stats and gives an additional skill point in the current skill (up to 40). Advancement also presents stronger enemies and masters; a player must challenge and defeat master Turgon himself to reach level 12, the final level, before attempting to search for and slay the dragon.

As a BBS game, LORD uses a text-only interface. Later versions of LORD also gave the option of using RIP (Remote Imaging Protocol) graphics, which required the use of a RIP client to view.

Players select a character class, choosing from among Death Knight Skills, Mystical Skills, and Thieving Skills. While a player is training in a particular skill, s/he is subject to random events in the woods for that particular skill, which provide opportunities for advancement. Eventually, players may master all three skills.

Players can take a certain number of actions every day. Actions could be to fight monsters in the forest, attack other players or to attempt to slay the red dragon itself. In addition, every day a player can send a "flirt" to another player character which may range from a shy wink, to sex, to a marriage proposal. Sometimes this can be done more than once a day. Sex may result in contracting sexually transmitted diseases, and female characters might become pregnant.

While a player is looking for forest monsters a number of random forest events can occur; these involve simple events such as finding gold or gems as well as interactions with a number of non-player characters such as Olivia, men/maidens in distress, the old hag, and the old man, and the opportunity to advance in your skill if they pass the test. This is also where a player encounters flowers in the fairy garden and meets up with a group of fairies bathing.

There are three non-player characters located at the Inn: Seth Able the bard, Violet the barmaid, and the unnamed Bartender. Seth Able the bard will sing a song for a player. Once a day, players can listen to Seth's song and receive a bonus, such as the doubling of one's bank account, or additional forest or player vs. player fight opportunities. The Bartender provides services and information to any warrior who can pay him in gold or gems, but provides nothing for free.

Male players can also flirt with Violet, and female players with Seth Able (named after Robinson), in a fashion similar to flirting with other players. Success is based on the player's charm points. A marriage to Violet or Seth may last one day or two months or more; unlike player-player marriages, the software may terminate these bonds at any time. During marriage, offspring are possible for male players, and more likely for female players. Offspring bring sometimes surprising benefits to warriors.

LORD allows many players to play simultaneously, in BBSs that support it. This allows real-time player-versus-player battles.

LORD features several in-game message boards, as well as a limited electronic mail system, which allow players to converse. Players may use the mail system to send flirtations to other players of the opposite sex, propose trysts, or marriage.

The registration system let all players play until level six, then it wouldn't allow players to get past to level 7 until the program was registered. Users often sent in funds for that very purpose. Some players even registered their own copy of LORD for local use so they could practice skills and test strategies.

=== IGMs ===
In-Game Modules (IGMs) are small software extensions written by third-party developers that add functionality to LORD. A number of these were created and widely distributed. IGM software was first developed on the Amiga, and then ported to MS-DOS. Some IGMs were written to allow a "cheating" style of game play, and others have presented bugs or loopholes to be exploited by players. The current maintainer of the LORD software has introduced a scripting language called Lady in order to allow smoother development of game extensions.

==== Wizardstone ====
Wizardstone was planned to be a major IGM; the author was so enthusiastic about it that he convinced Robinson to advertise it by mentioning its two main characters in a forest event within the game itself. The IGM had a number of features that Robinson was impressed with, most notably its blackjack game. Though the IGM Wizardstone was never released it is nonetheless important to the history of the game, being the only IGM mentioned in the game itself, the inspiration for the "Olivia" forest event character, and the source of the Blackjack event.

The IGM was supposed to contain an ending to Olivia's story, as stated in the game. There was once talk of adding an ending to Olivia's story to the game, but nothing ever came of it.

== Reception ==
The game sold only seven copies in its debut year, but word of mouth drove sales to 30,000 units over the next seven years of release.

In Gamasutra's essay on the history of computer role-playing video games, LORD was considered to be a highly playable and memorable game, with colorful text and humor. The Escapist magazine highlighted the way LORD handled sexuality, which became more mature as Robinson developed the game over the years.

== Ports and sequels ==
Robinson developed an official sequel, Legend of the Red Dragon II: New World, in 1992. It featured real-time multiplayer gameplay, with ANSI art graphics, in a roguelike top-down view. LORD II's final release came in 1998, before its sale to Metropolis Gameport.

The first LORD spin-off, Tournament LORD, was written by Robinson. It was a multiplayer version designed for the MBBS/Worldgroup BBS systems.

The second port was Wildcat Tournament Legend of the Red Dragon (WT-LORD), a multi-player version created for Wildcat! BBS systems, written by Joseph Marcelletti and Allan Benjamin. Robinson was impressed with this port and used some of its features in the next version of TLORD. It was maintained by IceRage Technologies but is now freeware and no longer developed or supported.

=== Legend of the Green Dragon ===
Legend of the Green Dragon is a Web-based variation with major differences in game play. Despite the similarity in name, it is an entirely different game that is not written or authorized by the author or the current owners of Legend of the Red Dragon. Legend of the Green Dragon (also referred to as LotGD) is an open-source game that allows any Web developer to customize and create their own version of the game using the PHP language.
