= Dungeon Scroll =

2003 video game

- Developer: Robinson Technologies
- Publisher: Robinson Technologies
- Platforms: Windows, Android, iOS
- Release: 2003
- Genres: Role-playing, word
- Mode: Single-player

Dungeon Scroll is a video game published by Robinson Technologies for Microsoft Windows in 2003. A Gold edition of the game was released in November 2005. In 2009, a mobile version was released for the iPhone, followed up by releases the next year for Android and Palm devices. The Windows version was an Independent Games Festival finalist at the 2004 Game Developers Conference.

== Gameplay ==
Dungeon Scroll is a spelling game given a dungeon RPG theme. Players are given eight letter tiles to use to spell words that deal damage to the enemies they encounter in the dungeon. The bigger the word, the more damage that is dealt to the baddies. At the same time, the enemies are attacking the player, carving away at the player's health. If the player's health hits zero, they lose the game.

The game features three difficulty settings, ranging from Kid to Normal to Wizard (Hard). The game features special tiles that appear occasionally that help players spell words. And there are enemies that are referred to as bosses. These bosses are slightly harder to defeat, requiring harder, longer words to deal higher damage.
