= Turbo Turtle Adventure =

2002 video game

- Developer: Iridon Interactive
- Publisher: Majesco
- Platform: Game Boy Advance
- Release: 7 October 2002
- Genre: Puzzle
- Mode: Single player

Turbo Turtle Adventure is a 2002 puzzle video game for the Game Boy Advance developed by Iridon Interactive and published by Majesco. Gameplay involves guiding a rolling turtle through a series of levels, whilst avoiding obstacles. Upon release, the game received generally positive reviews, with praise directed to its addictiveness and resemblance to puzzle titles including Super Monkey Ball and Marble Madness, and criticism to its repetitive trial-and error gameplay.

== Gameplay ==
A screenshot of Turbo Turtle Adventure.

Turbo Turtle Adventure is a puzzle video game in which the objective of the game is to guide a rolling turtle through a series of 50 maze-like levels, and complete the level before the timer expires. Movement is controlled with the D-Pad, and jumping with the A button. Each stage has terrain that influences movement, including crumbling floors, slippery and sticky surfaces, and arrows that force movement in a specific direction. Obstacles including fans and magnets can also push the player. Players can collect and use power-ups throughout levels by pressing the B button, including abilities that allow the turtle to bounce over or fill in gaps, or Glide and Spike shells that reduce the impact of terrain. Color-coded keys must also be collected to open doors to access other areas of the level. Players can unlock bonus levels accessible through discovering invisible platforms in the level.

== Development ==
Turbo Turtle Adventure was developed by Iridon Interactive, a small Swedish studio led by director and executive producer Björn Larsson. Majesco announced its release in May 2002, with the game slated for the company's holiday lineup. The game was also exhibited at E3 2002. To support release of Turbo Turtle Adventure, Iridion published a promotional website in September.

== Reception ==
Reception

Aggregate score
Aggregator	Score
Metacritic	70%

Review scores
Publication	Score
AllGame	3.5/5
GameSpy	69%
GameZone	7.8/10
IGN	7.5/10
Nintendo Power	3.2/5

Turbo Turtle Adventure received "Mixed or Average" reviews, according to review aggregator Metacritic. Several critics compared the game to the Super Monkey Ball and Marble Madness titles. Craig Harris of IGN praised the game as a "decent challenge", highlighting the number of levels and addictiveness of the game, but considered it "doesn't offer a lot of surprises beyond the formula". Describing the game as "surprisingly addictive", Anise Hollingshead of GameZone commended the game's "complex" puzzle gameplay and "pleasant" music and design, although wished the game had a more intuitive interface, minimap and greater replayability. Edge stated the game "doesn't look pretty", but has a "simple and compulsive inertial charm". In a retrospective review, Brett Elston of GamesRadar assessed the game as a "decent puzzle-action game" in spite of its "horrendous box art", highlighting the game's background music for the Space Station level as "wistful" and "remarkably impactful". However, several reviews also noted the game could be repetitive, with trial and error in replaying levels necessary to progress.
