= Growtopia =

2012 video game

- Developers: Ubisoft Abu Dhabi (Note: Developed by Robinson Technologies and Hamumu Software until 2017.); Ubisoft Pune
- Publisher: Ubisoft (Note: Published by Robinson Technologies until 2017.)
- Designers: Ubisoft (2017-present): Ubisoft Abu Dhabi; nPlus1 (Note: In-game username. The names of employees, moderators, and programmers are not disclosed.); markfeller; Formerly: Robinson Technologies; Seth Robinson (2013-2017); Hamumu Software; Mike Hommel (2013-2017)
- Programmers: Ubisoft (2017-present): Ubisoft Abu Dhabi; ThePsyborg; MystikCorpse; Morse1; Seth Robinson (until 2017)
- Artist: Mike Hommel (2013-2017)
- Composer: Cory Mollenhour
- Platforms: Android iOS; Microsoft Windows; OS X
- Release: January 9, 2013: Android, iOS January 9, 2013 Windows July 9, 2013 OS X July 27, 2013 Nintendo Switch, PlayStation 4, Xbox One July 18, 2019
- Genres: Sandbox, adventure
- Mode: Multiplayer

Growtopia is a massively multiplayer online sandbox video game developed by Ubisoft Abu Dhabi and formerly by indie developers Robinson Technologies and Hamumu Software where players can farm, build worlds, converse with others, and engage in player versus player combat. The game was initially released for Android in November 2012, and later for iOS, Microsoft Windows, and OS X in 2013. It was also released for the Nintendo Switch, PlayStation 4, and Xbox One in 2019, but support for each console would later be discontinued on July 30, 2020.

On February 28, 2017, a Ubisoft acquirement of Growtopia was announced and completed during Ubisoft's 2016-17 fourth quarter, with the original developers becoming design and general advisors for the game's continued development. Growtopia utilizes the freemium model.

== Gameplay ==
Growtopia is a 2D massively multiplayer online sandbox video game based around the idea that most of the in-game items can be grown from their corresponding seeds. The game has no end goals or 100% completion, but has an achievement system and quests to complete from non-player characters.

Players start out with two basic tools: a fist for punching and breaking blocks, and a wrench for editing block properties, adding players and trading items. Players can also visit other people's worlds or create their own, with each world being procedurally generated.

Players are tasked with breaking blocks to acquire seeds, which can be planted to produce more blocks, or spliced together to produce new types of items. Players can also gather gems from breaking blocks, harvesting trees, and other activities, which can be used to purchase items from the in-game store, including locks, which have the capability of restricting certain areas to their owner. World Locks, which can lock entire worlds, act as the game's official currency among trading.

Growtopia has a series of guidelines that the player must follow, with these being enforced by the developers and moderators, who can be identified with the prefixes @ and @ respectively. The development team is also tasked with helping players, interacting with the community, and gathering feedback.

== Development ==
Production of Growtopia started in 2012, when designer Seth Robinson made six mockup screenshots outlining the premise of the game of which he originally called Buildo, and sent it to Mike Hommel to entice him into helping with the project. The game's user interface started to take shape with Hommel's mockups. On October 22, 2012, Hommel uploaded a video to his YouTube channel showing the development of the game before its release.

During initial development, Robinson and Hommel brought in the help of composer Cory Mollenhour to produce Growtopia's soundtrack.

After three months of development, the game was released on Android as a free beta on November 30, 2012, under the name Growtopia. They moved the game out of beta and released the full version on January 9, 2013. The game has been updated ever since. On February 28, 2017, Ubisoft announced an acquisition of Growtopia. The transaction was completed during Ubisoft's 2016-17 fourth quarter, under the terms that the original developers would continue being both design and general advisors to the game's continued development. A North American community management and moderation team was set up after Ubisoft's acquisition. They handed responsibility of the game's future development over to their Ubisoft Abu Dhabi team. The team has been working continuously on Growtopia ever since.

== Release ==
The game can be played on multiple operating systems, including Microsoft Windows, OS X, iOS, and Android. The iOS and Android versions were released on January 9, 2013, after an initial period of beta testing for Android starting in November 2012. Following these mobile releases, the game was brought to computers; a Windows beta version was released on July 9, 2013, and a OS X version was released on July 27, 2013.

Growtopia was available for a period of time on the Nintendo Switch, PlayStation 4, and Xbox One from July 18, 2019, to July 30, 2020, before being discontinued in order to "allocate all resources back to support the Mobile and PC version". The decision to discontinue all console support was declared on April 27, 2020, and had followed from a previous announcement on January 19, 2020, which had notified the community that there would no longer be any major updates or annual events for the consoles platforms, as their team only had "limited resources available". An Ubisoft Abu Dhabi team member stated that since there were "many, many more players playing on Android, iOS, and PC", they were going to focus their resources back towards those platforms.

Growtopia has since been released on Steam, since March 7, 2024.

== Reception ==
Reception

Aggregate score
Aggregator	Score
GameRankings	iOS: 70%

Review scores
Publication	Score
148Apps	iOS: 4/5
Pocket Gamer	iOS/Android: 6/10

Growtopia received "mixed or average" reviews from critics according to review aggregator GameRankings.

Jay Is Games described the game as "simple and easy enough to work on the mobile platform (and be fun for kids), but with enough room for customization and socialization". 148Apps gave the game a 4/5, saying "the crafting mechanic is unique". Pocket Gamer's Peter Willington scored the game 6 out of 10, criticizing the design of the UI and the characters. TouchArcade wrote "With online games like this that take place in persistent worlds where everyone can interact, you’ll no doubt get some people trying to destroy things and generally make life tough for everyone else".
