= Pearl Harbor Trilogy – 1941: Red Sun Rising =

2010 flight simulator

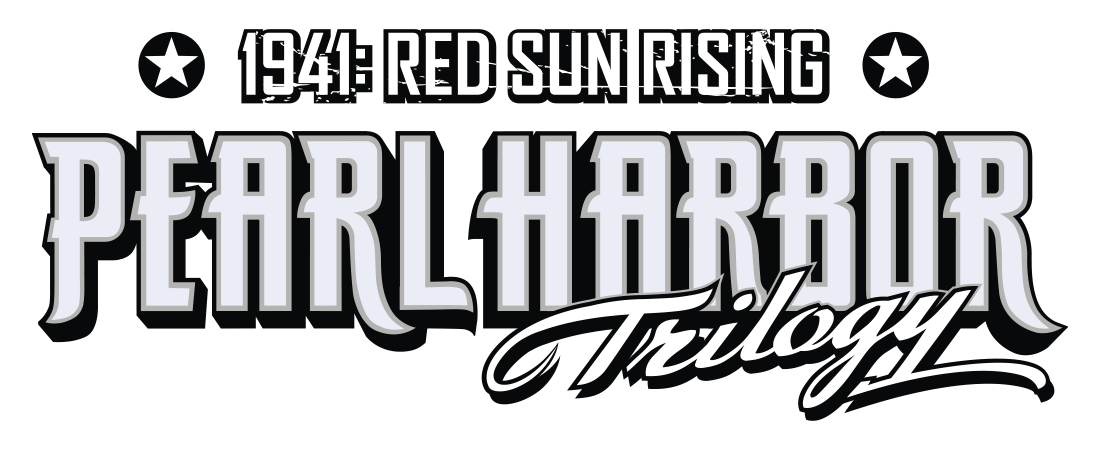
- Developer: Legendo Entertainment (Note: Co-developed with Arcade Moon)
- Publisher: Legendo Entertainment
- Producer: Björn Larsson
- Programmers: Stanislav Petri; Peto Kendra; Mats Höjlund
- Composers: Alexander Röder; Fabian Del Priore; Janne Suni; Jaakko Kaitaniemi
- Platform: Wii
- Release: NA: July 5, 2010; EU: July 16, 2010; AU: July 16, 2010
- Genres: Action-adventure, combat flight simulation
- Mode: Single-player

Pearl Harbor Trilogy – 1941: Red Sun Rising is a flight simulator developed and published by Legendo Entertainment. The game is based on the attack on Pearl Harbor and the following Battles of Wake Island, Midway, and the Coral Sea. The game is presented through a third-person perspective. In the single-player campaign, the players assumes control of either a United States Army Air Force pilot or an Imperial Japanese Navy pilot. Both pilots have eight single-player missions each, beginning during the Attack on Pearl Harbor and chronologically featuring the key battles that followed, including the Battle of Wake Island, Battle of Midway, and Battle of the Coral Sea.

The game is a partial remake of Legendo Entertainment's 2007 game Attack on Pearl Harbor. The game was intended as the first in a trilogy, splitting the campaigns of Attack on Pearl Harbor into three. Legendo decided to focus on the attack on Pearl Harbor as the team considered it an important historical event that essentially forced the United States to enter World War II. The game was released for the Wii in July 2010. It received positive reviews from critics, who generally approved of the controls and graphics, though some were divided on difficulty spikes during gameplay.

== Gameplay ==
Pearl Harbor Trilogy – 1941: Red Sun Rising is a combat flight simulation game that is played from a third-person perspective. In the game's single-player campaign, the player assumes control of one of two fictional pilots: a United States Army Air Forces pilot or an Imperial Japanese Navy pilot. Both pilots have eight single-player missions each, beginning during the Attack on Pearl Harbor and chronologically featuring the key battles that followed, including the Battle of Wake Island, Battle of Midway, and Battle of the Coral Sea. The game's cutscenes are presented in a comic book-like fashion.

The player assumes control of several historic aircraft such as the Curtiss P-40 Warhawk, Grumman F4F Wildcat, and Mitsubishi A6M Zero; the game features 10 aircraft options. The game features three different control schemes—Wii Remote, Wii Remote and Nunchuk, and Classic Controller. The former two schemes utilise the controllers' motion detection capabilities. If the player fails a mission, planes are deducted from their reserve, and the campaign ends in defeat once all planes are deducted. Aircraft carry unlimited ammunition, limited only by overheating for machine guns and reloading times for rockets, bombs, and torpedoes. Each mission can be played through three different perspectives: fighter, bomber, and torpedo. The game features three Dogfight modes: Avenging Aces, where the player must achieve a set number of kills; Survival, wherein a time limit is set for the player to survive enemy waves; and Free Flight, which lets the player fly freely.

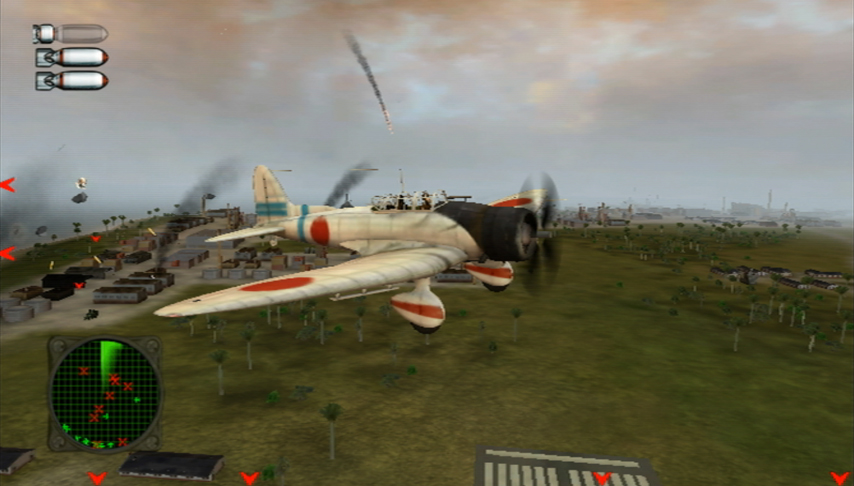
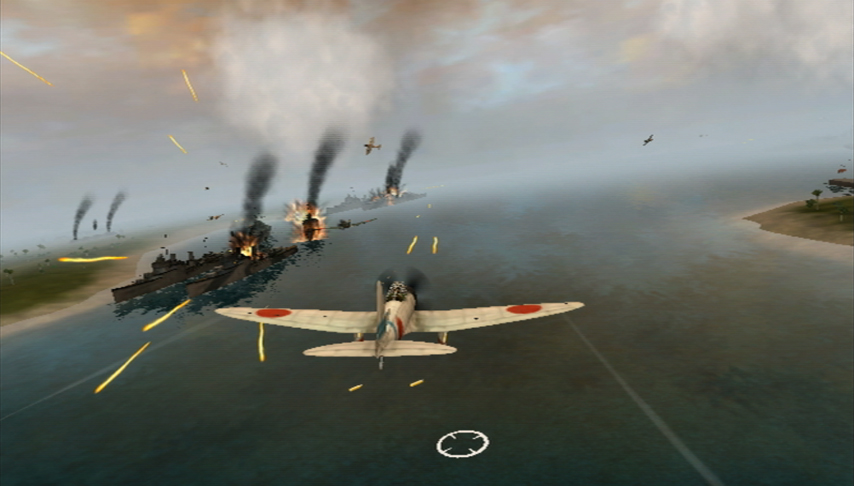
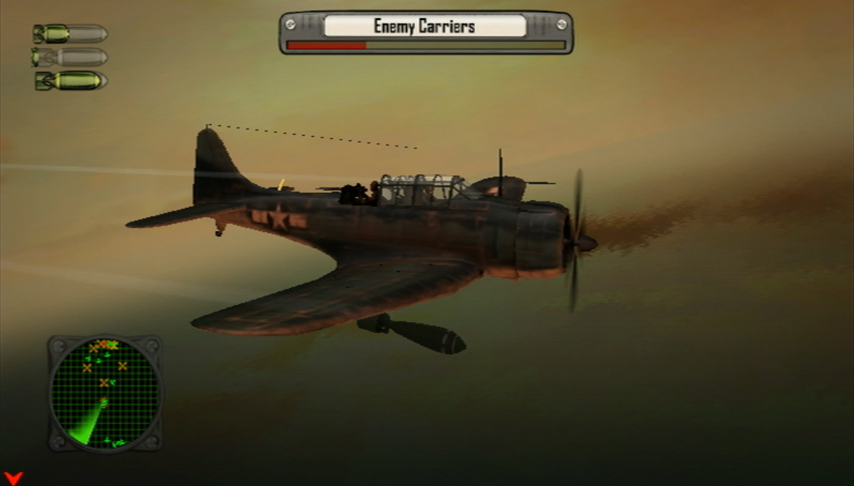
The player assumes control of a fictional pilot during the Attack on Pearl Harbor. Gameplay can be viewed from several different perspectives.

== Development and release ==
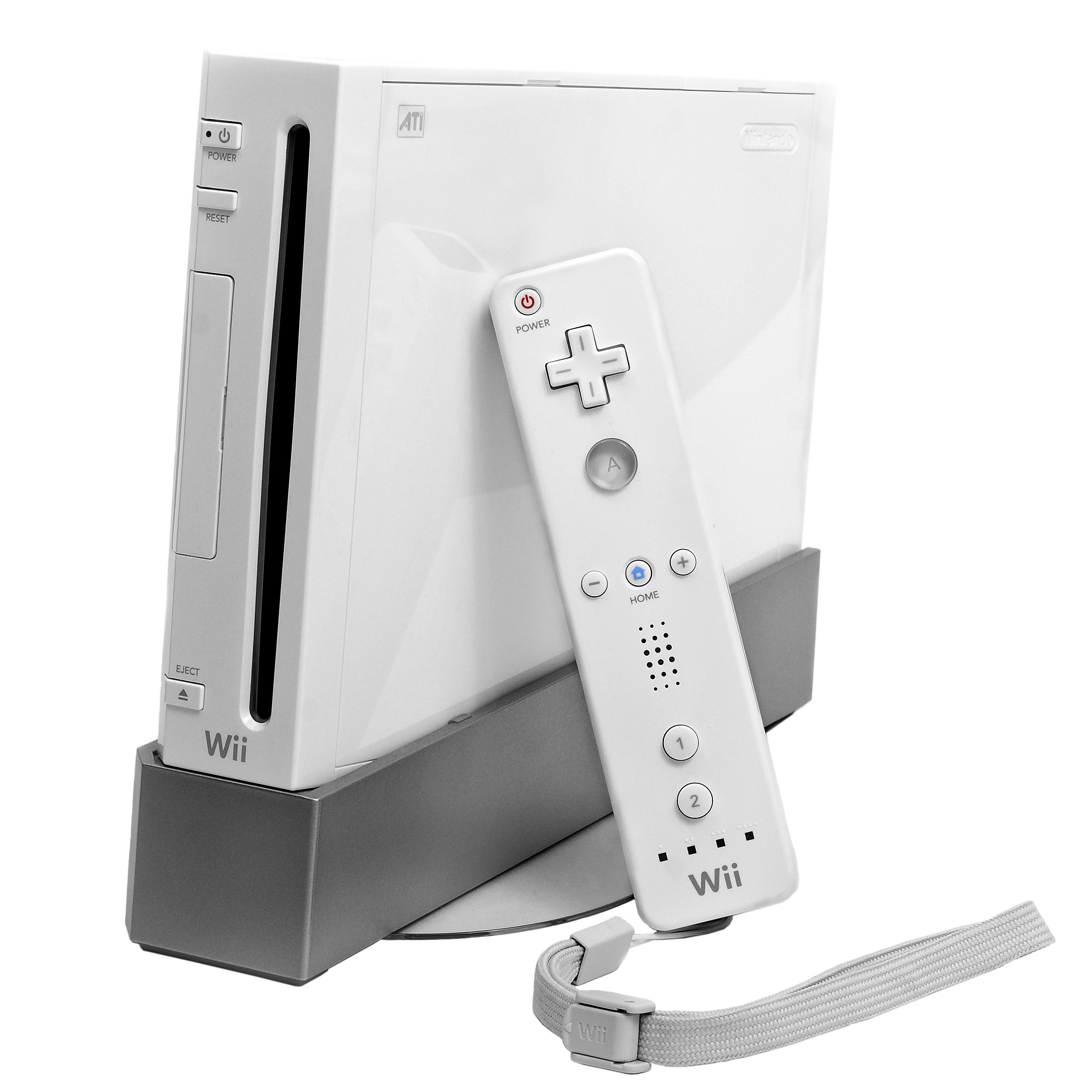
Red Sun Rising was developed for the Wii as the developer felt that the aerial gameplay matched well with the console's motion detection capabilities.

Pearl Harbor Trilogy – 1941: Red Sun Rising is a partial remake of Legendo Entertainment's 2007 game Attack on Pearl Harbor. The game was intended as the first in a trilogy, splitting the campaigns of Attack on Pearl Harbor into three. Subsequent episodes in the trilogy were set to add more plane types and missions from later in the war, as well as additional gameplay mechanics. The decision to split the game was made partly due to the Wii's storage capacities, as well as the developer's ability to allow additional development time for each title and make changes based on player feedback. The developer wanted to port the game to the Wii as it felt that the aerial gameplay matched well with the motion controls. During development, the team focused on taking advantage of the limitations of the Wii, taking some time to work on the water effects.

Executive producer Björn Larsson found that other flight games featured "unnecessarily complex" controls, so the team set out to create a game that was enjoyable to play and emphasized historical accuracy "but would in no way be mistaken for a simulator". The team also wanted to pay homage to arcade and classic console games. Legendo decided to focus on the attack on Pearl Harbor as the team considered it an important historical event that essentially forced the United States to enter World War II. The team aimed to develop a game worthy of the name, which they felt previous games had failed to do. The developers considered adding support for the Wii MotionPlus, but felt it would add to the development time and render the targeting system too simple. The game's comic book-style cutscenes were inspired by artists such as Joe Kubert.

Pearl Harbor Trilogy was announced in September 2009. The game was released as WiiWare in July 2010.

== Reception ==
Reception

Aggregate score
| Aggregator | Score |
|---|---|
| Metacritic | 70/100 |

Review scores
| Publication | Score |
|---|---|
| Eurogamer | 6/10 |
| IGN | 7/10 |
| Nintendo Life | 8/10 |
| Nintendo World Report | 8.5/10 |
| PALGN | 8/10 |

Pearl Harbor Trilogy – 1941: Red Sun Rising received "mixed or average reviews", according to review aggregator Metacritic. Matthew Blundon of Nintendo World Report called it "one of the better WiiWare games to date", while Jeremy Jastrzab of PALGN described it as "one of the better aerial combat games available on the Wii". Nintendo Life's Spencer McIlvaine concluded that the game "offers a thrilling experience that will encourage returning to replay it again and again".

Eurogamer's Kristan Reed considered the game's visuals to be "impressive". Lucas M. Thomas of IGN wrote that the game's visuals were more impressive than other WiiWare titles. Blundon of Nintendo World Report similarly described the game as "one of the best looking and sounding WiiWare games to date". Nintendo Life's McIlvaine and PALGN's Jastrzab recognized the game's graphical downgrade from the PC version, but the latter noted that it "looks quite reasonable" for a WiiWare game.

Jastrzab of PALGN appreciated the ability to play each mission from different perspectives, but felt that the missions lacked variety. McIlvaine of Nintendo Life praised the game's artificial intelligence, but felt that their skill led to difficulty spikes. IGN's Thomas criticized the game's sharp difficulty spikes, particularly due to the removal of the original game's "Casual" setting. Eurogamer's Reed echoed similar sentiments, but recognized its potential. Reed also praised the game's tilt-based controls. Blundon of Nintendo World Report deemed the controls "irritating at first", but overall felt that "there is plenty of enjoyment to be had shooting down enemy planes".
