= Billy Blade and the Temple of Time =

2005 video game

- Developers: Iridon Interactive; Nerlaska Studio
- Publishers: SWE: Nordic Softsales; UK: Fusion Software
- Platform: Windows
- Release: SWE: March 25, 2005; UK: April 8, 2005
- Genre: Action-adventure
- Mode: Single player

Billy Blade and the Temple of Time (Swedish: Billy Blade: Tidens Tempel) is an Action-adventure video game co-developed by Iridon Interactive and Nerlaska Studio, released in March 25, 2005 for PC.

== Plot ==
Billy Blade is a young explorer and swordsman with a blue monkey companion named Kong. Using a map, he discovers the legendary Temple of Time. Inside, he discovers the Time Crystal, but as he tries to take it, it flies out of his hands and sucks Kong inside. To free him, Billy Blade must travel back to three different locations: the Ice Age, Persia and the Caribbean and defeat the Guardians there. After freeing Kong, the temple collapses as Billy and Kong escape.

== Gameplay ==
Billy Blade and the Temple of Time is a 3D Action-Adventure game. Billy can jump and double jump, kick open crates and chests and slash enemies with his swords. Billy can also find a Fireblade that allows him to shoot fireballs at enemies, and a Blueblade that allows him to attack faster.

== Reception ==
Reception

Review scores
Publication	Score
Win Magazine	8/10
Gry-Online	6.9
Click!	1+/5
PC Zone	38/100
Game World Navigator	3.1/10

PC Zone criticized Billy Blade and the Temple of Time's camera, "almost non-existent" AI, "infuriating" platforming, and "clumsy" combat.
