= Dracula Twins =

2006 video game

- Developers: Legendo Entertainment; Nerlaska Studio
- Publisher: Legendo Entertainment
- Director: Björn Larsson
- Producers: Björn Larsson; Alberto De Hoyo Nebot
- Programmer: Alberto De Hoyo Nebot
- Artists: Joe Sharp; Rob Sharp
- Writer: Björn Larsson
- Composer: Alexander Röder
- Platform: Microsoft Windows
- Release: October 2006
- Genre: Platform
- Mode: Single-player

Dracula Twins is a platform game developed by Legendo Entertainment and Nerlaska Studio. It was released for Microsoft Windows in October 2006. The single-player game is presented through a third-person perspective. The player controls Drac and Dracana, the twin children of the vampire Count Dracula. The twins have their own special abilities, and earn magic points to cast spells to defeat enemies. The game received generally positive reviews from critics. It received a sequel for iOS in November 2013, with another currently in development for Apple TV, Windows, Nintendo Switch, and Xbox One.

== Gameplay ==
The player must collect blood rubies, earning them magic points to use for spells to defeat enemies.

Dracula Twins is a platform game. It features two-dimensional movement through a cartoonish three-dimensional environment, including more than 40 stages. In the game, Count Dracula has been captured by Doctor Lifelust and his horde of vampire hunters who plan to create a serum that grants him immortality. Dracula's twin vampire children, Drac and Dracana, seek to save him. The player can switch between the twins, who have their own special abilities. The player must collect blood rubies, which earns them magic points (MP) to help cast spells to defeat enemies.

== Development and release ==
Dracula Twins was developed and published by Legendo Entertainment. It was directed and written by Björn Larsson, who also co-produced alongside Alberto De Hoyo Nebot, the main programmer. Joe Sharp and Rob Sharp led the art direction, while Alexander Röder composed the original music. The game was announced on 29 March 2006. It was playable at Games Convention in August 2006, alongside other titles by Legendo. A trailer and screenshots were released on 1 June 2006. Game development ceased by 12 October 2006, when it was submitted for manufacturing. It was available for purchase in October 2006 in Europe. A demo was also released on 19 October with several language options. Legendo partnered with Meridian4 for the North American publication of the game. Dracula Twins was added to the GameTap library in April 2008.

== Reception ==
Dracula Twins received generally positive reviews. After playing the demo, Tetsuya Asakura of 4Gamer.net recommended it for fans of side-scrolling action games, applauding the horror atmosphere. Gamezebo's Joel Brodie awarded Dracula Twins a score of 3.5/5, praising the game's world, music, sound effect, and play style; however, he criticised its 3D environment, controls, and lack of monster variety. Four reviewers at Game Tunnel awarded it a combined score of 6.7/10, with Mike Hommel appreciating the style and genre while noting a "flawed implementation", and Russ Carroll describing the graphics as "really wonderful". Daniel Boll of GBase gave the game 5/10, praising the graphics, gameplay, and controls; however, he found the enjoyment limited to the opening levels. Igromania's Georgy Kurgan applauded the game's Russian port by Noviy Disk.

== Sequels ==
Dracula Twins received an identically-named sequel on iOS devices in November 2013. It was distributed for free and featured five levels, with more to be made if players contributed financially. It was released for Apple TV in September 2015. Another sequel, Dracula Twins R2: School's Out, is in development for Apple TV, Microsoft Windows (via Steam), Nintendo Switch, and Xbox One.
