= The Three Musketeers (2006 video game) =

- Developer: Legendo Entertainment
- Publisher: Legendo Entertainment
- Designers: Jan Almqvist; Björn Larsson
- Platform: Windows
- Release: November 2005
- Genre: Platform
- Mode: Single player

The Three Musketeers (Swedish: De Tre Musketörerna) is a platform video game published and developed by Swedish developer-publisher Legendo Entertainment. It was released in Europe on February 22, 2006, and is rated 7+ by PEGI. The European release, which included Scandinavian releases in partnership with Ubisoft, saw the game sold both in boxed form at retail outlets and online; in other territories, the game may only be downloaded. The game supports more than ten different settings for various languages. A WiiWare version entitled The Three Musketeers: One for All! was released in North America on July 27, 2009 and in the PAL regions on July 31, 2009.

== Gameplay ==
The game, which features two-dimensional movement through a cartoonish three-dimensional environment, is loosely based on the 1844 Alexandre Dumas, père classic The Three Musketeers. In the game, the player controls Porthos in an attempt to save his kidnapped companions.

== Reception ==
The game was nominated for a 2006 Swedish Game Award in the category Family Game of the Year. In contrast, the UK Official Nintendo Magazine gave the WiiWare version 20%, saying,"There are hundreds of games that are worth your money more than this hopelessly generic, lazily conceived side-scroller". Thus, it currently stands as the lowest score that the magazine has given to a WiiWare game.
