= Pure Pinball =

- Series logo as seen in Pure Pinball: Steel Ball Magic
- Genre: Pinball simulation
- Developer: Legendo Entertainment (Note: Formerly known as Iridon Interactive.)
- Publisher: Legendo Entertainment (Note: First game was published by XS Games in North America, and Simon & Schuster in the United Kingdom.)
- Creator: Björn Larsson
- Platforms: Microsoft Windows, Xbox, iOS, PlayStation 5, Xbox Series X/S
- First release: Pure Pinball; May 28, 2003
- Latest release: FCB Pinball; June 10, 2014

Pure Pinball is a series of pinball simulation video games developed and published by Legendo Entertainment The single-player games feature several themed pinball tables, each with different mechanics and game modes. The game engines mimic the physics of real pinball machines. The player can choose from several different camera angles to follow the gameplay.

The first game in the series, Pure Pinball, was released for Microsoft Windows in May 2003 and for Xbox in August 2004. An enhanced version, Pure Pinball 2.0, was released for Windows in February 2005. To celebrate the first game's tenth anniversary in 2013, it was released on iOS as Pure Pinball: T-Rex Savage. The most recent game, FCB Pinball, was released for iOS in June 2014 as the official pinball game for FC Barcelona. A reboot is currently in development and due for release in 2022 for PlayStation 5 and Xbox Series X and Series S.

Games in the series have generally been praised as among the best pinball simulation games. In particular, the first game and its mobile remake received particular praise directed at its physics, graphics, and sound effects.

== Games ==
- Pure Pinball was released for Microsoft Windows on May 28, 2003, and for Xbox on August 5, 2004. The Xbox version of the game uses the Xbox controller's vibration function, and it used leaderboards through Xbox Live. Pure Pinball is now supported on the replacement online servers for the Xbox called Insignia.
- Pure Pinball 2.0 was released for Microsoft Windows on February 4, 2005. It is an enhanced version of the original game. The game was added to GOG.com in January 2009.
- Pure Pinball: T-Rex Savage was released for iOS devices in 2013 to celebrate the first game's tenth anniversary. Its theme is centered around dinosaurs. It was released on Apple TV in September 2015.
- FCB Pinball was released for iOS devices on June 10, 2014. It is considered the "official pinball" game of the Spanish football club FC Barcelona, and is themed around the club, with football-themed modes and challenges.
- Pure Pinball: Steel Ball Magic is a reboot of the series, set to release on PlayStation 5 and Xbox Series X and Series S in 2022.

== Common elements ==
Pure Pinball is a series of pinball simulation video games. The games feature several themed pinball tables. The first game features: World War, a war-themed table; Runaway Train, a locomotive-themed table; Excessive Speed, based on racecars; and Hyper Space, based on space. Each of the tables include different mechanics, structure, and game modes. When the game begins, balls are released onto the central chamber of the board, and the player controls various flippers and bumpers throughout the simulated pinball table in order manipulate the ball into certain positions and score points. The game's engine mimics the physics of real pinball machines. In the games, the player can choose from 12 different camera angles, including close-ups, following the ball, top-down, and traditional scrolling.

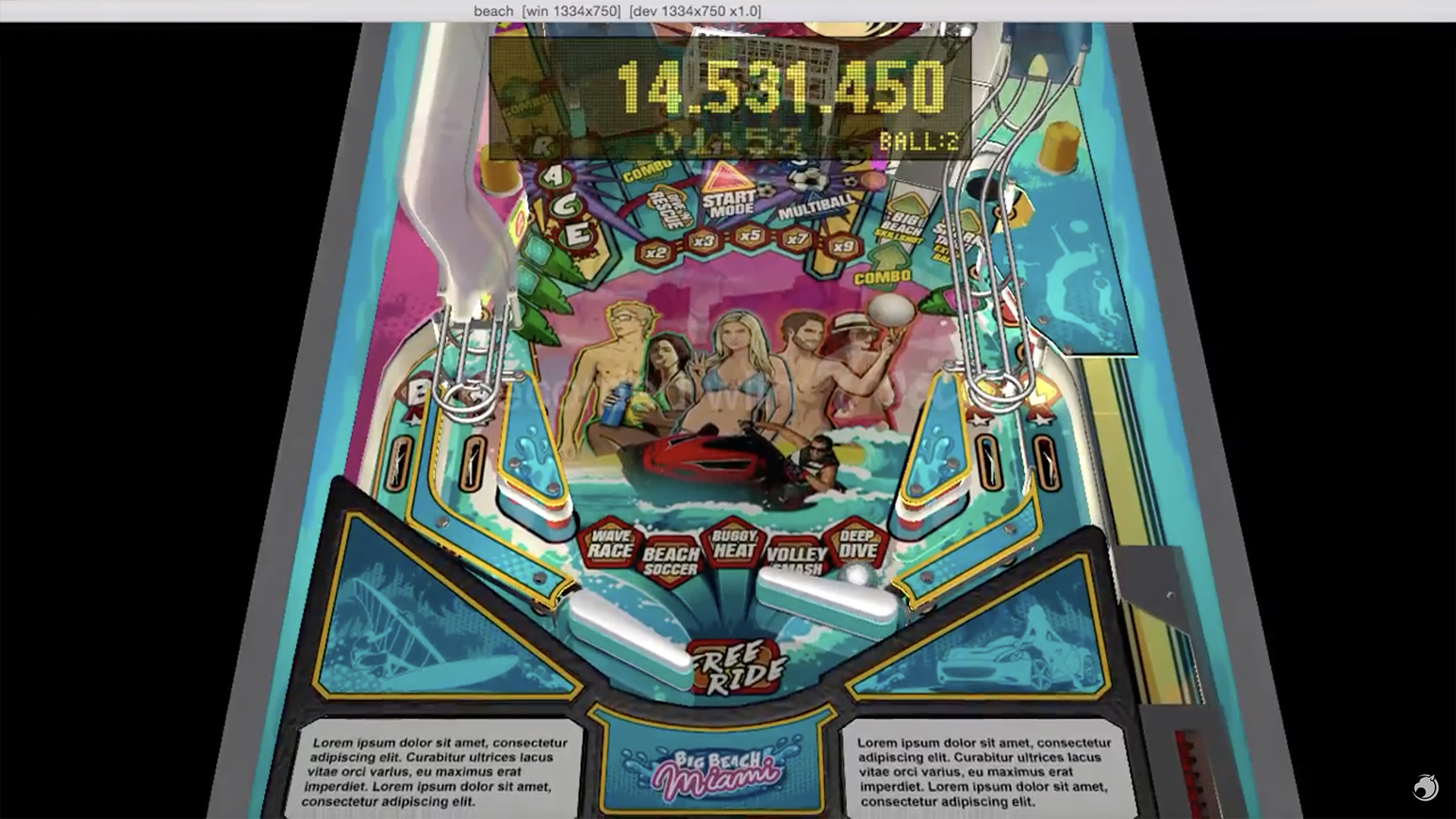
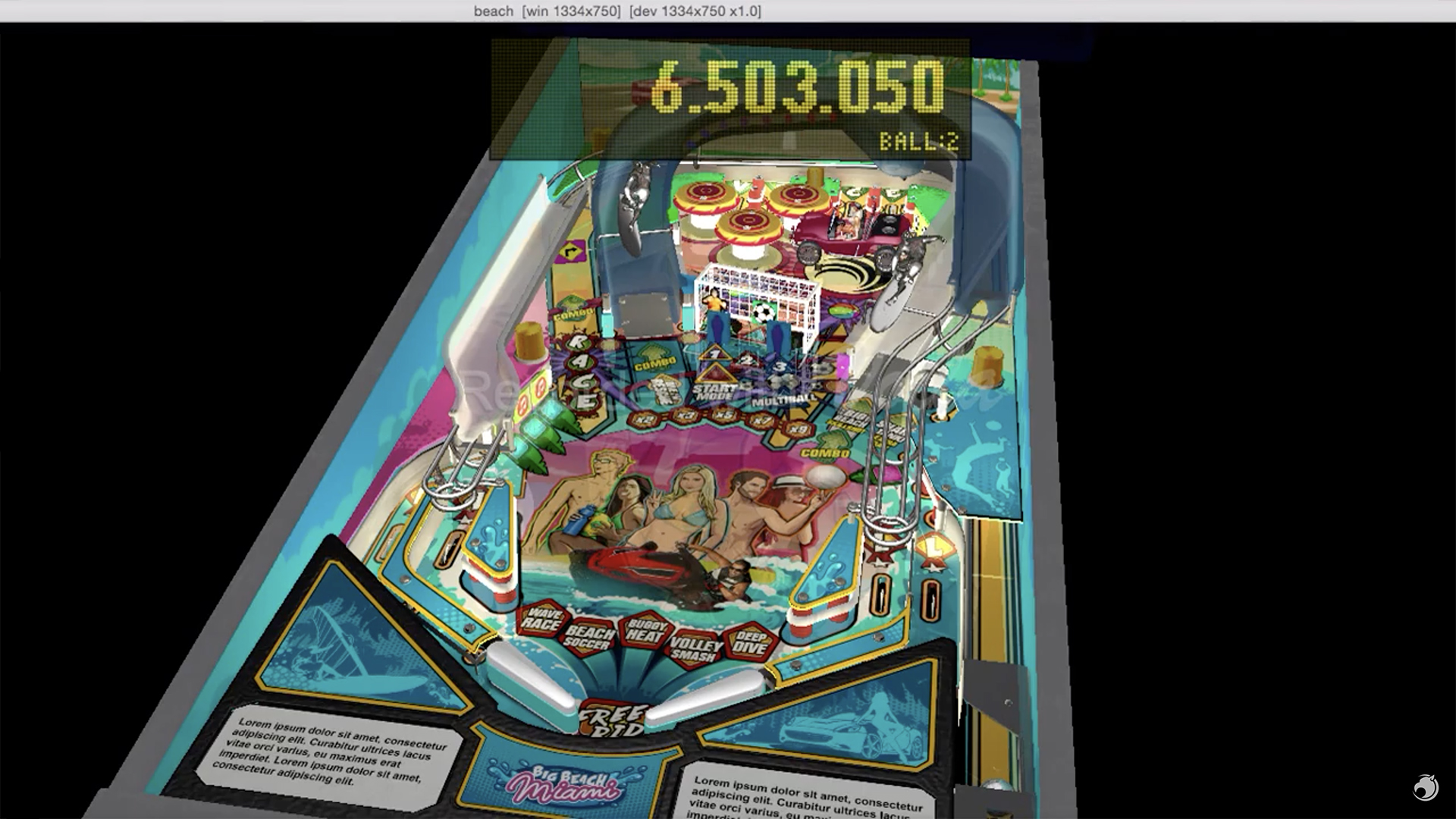
The games feature several themed pinball tables. Pictured is the Big Beach Miami prototype table.

== Development ==
Sweden-based studio Legendo Entertainment first announced Pure Pinball in March 2003, with a release set for the second quarter. Development ceased by April 30, 2003, when the game was submitted for manufacturing. It was released for Microsoft Windows on May 28, 2003. In July 2004, XS Games entered an agreement with Take-Two Interactive to publish Pure Pinball in North America for the Xbox; it was released on August 5, 2004. In October 2004, XS Games partnered with MC2 France for French distribution. It was published in the United Kingdom by Simon & Schuster. Each of the four tables features different actors: Sophie Aldred for Excessive Speed, Csaba Nagy for World War, Harry Ditson for Runaway Train, and Sam Coughlan for HyperSpace.

Following the success of the first game, an enhanced version, Pure Pinball 2.0, was released for Microsoft Windows on February 4, 2005. To celebrate the game's tenth anniversary in 2013, the game was released on iOS as Pure Pinball: T-Rex Savage, with a theme centered around dinosaurs. The game was rebuilt for mobile devices and powered by a new 3D engine capable of up to 60 frames per second. A new mode called Big Beach Miami was in development in 2015 but eventually abandoned. A prototype for the game featured the retrowave song "Exclusive Coupé" by Myrone. When presenting the prototype, the developers noted that it "sacrifices HDR resolution for fluidity and speed", prioritisting gameplay over graphics. In May 2014, Legendo announced FCB Pinball, considered the "official pinball" of the Spanish football club FC Barcelona; it was released for iOS on June 10, 2014.

Legendo is currently developing a reboot of the series titled Pure Pinball: Steel Ball Magic. In October 2020, director and producer Björn Larsson noted that the game's engine "is not yet at the visual fidelity" desired, but that "its underlying collision, physics, and photo-realistic rendering is beginning to take form". Larsson aims for the game to "simulate highly realistic physics and pixel-perfect input to provide gamers with the fastest virtual pinball response loop ever". The game is scheduled for release in 2022 for PlayStation 5 and Xbox Series X and Series S.

== Reception ==
=== Pure Pinball ===
Pure Pinball reception

Aggregate score
Aggregator	Score
Metacritic	68/100

Review scores
Publication	Score
4Players	82%
GameSpot	6.9/10
IGN	6.7/10
Official Xbox Magazine (US)	76/100
PC Games (DE)	7/10
TeamXbox	7.3/10

Pure Pinball received "mixed or average" reviews, according to review aggregator Metacritic, with an average score of 68 out of 100 for Xbox. Paul Kautz of 4Players considered the game the best pinball simulator to date, while Dale Nardozzi of TeamXbox called it "the best iteration of a classic ball and flipper game out there". Jeff Gerstmann of GameSpot concluded that, "if you're a fan of video pinball, Pure Pinball has what you need".

Critics praised the game's physics. Official Xbox Magazine wrote that the "ball physics are outstanding—every hit feels like it has real weight". Gerstmann of GameSpot felt that the game "does a fantastic job" in regards to the ball's movements and reactions. IGN's Hilary Goldstein called the game's physics its "greatest success", noting that "there's never a moment where the ball is doing anything unnatural". TeamXbox's Nardozzi found the physics "quite amazing", comparing the game to a real pinball machine.

Kautz of 4Players considered the game's graphics far more detailed than the Pro Pinball games, and was impressed with its quick rendering time. Nardozzi of TeamXbox acknowledged the work required for the detailed table designs, noting that the developers "really captured the look of an arcade classic, without being too cutesy about it". GameSpot's Gerstmann praised the bright colors of the different tables, comparing them to the popular pinball tables of the mid-1990s. He also appreciated the reflective glass that covers the machines. IGN's Goldstein offered similar praise, describing the table as "almost photo-realistic".

Rüdiger Steidle of PC Games appreciated the use of different camera angles for all necessary views. Gerstmann of GameSpot found the isometric and top-down views to be the most effective, noting that the low angles "look pretty cool and dramatic, but they aren't very usable". Game design consultant Ernest W. Adams applauded Pure Pinball for its use of several camera angles to improve accessibility, though found the changing perspectives "a bit dizzying". Nardozzi of TeamXbox felt that the camera was the only negative element of the game.

The game's sound effects received praise. Kautz of 4Players noted that they sounded real. GameSpot's Gerstmann wrote that the game "generally sounds like a pinball machine should sound", appreciating the unique sounds of each table. Nardozzi of TeamXbox appreciated the noises and voices in the pinball machine's sound board, though felt that other audio elements were lacking.

=== Pure Pinball: T-Rex Savage ===
Pure Pinball: T-Rex Savage reception

Review scores
Publication	Score
148Apps	3/5
Nine Over Ten	4.5/5

Pure Pinball: T-Rex Savage also received positive reviews from critics. Marc Luoma of iPad Insight wrote that the game is "super-realistic and beautiful to look at", noting that the developers "went to considerable lengths to make sure all the gameplay, graphics, and physics match what you'd find on a real pinball table". Jason Lee Wei Zheng of Nine Over Ten appreciated the game's simple controls, advanced visuals, and multiple camera modes. Blake Grundman of 148Apps said that "when it comes to physics emulation this is a title that can hold its own", adding that additional tables and missions would be beneficial.

=== FCB Pinball ===
FCB Pinball reception

Review scores
Publication	Score
Games Fiends	6.5/10
GamesReviews	3.7/5

FCB Pinball received generally positive reviews. Jake of Brutal Gamer found the game "well presented", noting that it is enjoyable to play in short periods. Adam Roffell of GamesReviews described the game as "bright and vibrant", praising the implementation of football mechanics within the pinball machine. Amy Nelson of Games Fiends appreciated the game's art and sound, as well as its lack of technical problems, but critiqued its lack of variety.
