= TrueAchievements =

Video game achievement tracking website

- The homepage of TrueAchievements on 15 July 2010
- Website type: Achievement tracking/Social networking
- Owner: Richard Stone
- Website: www.trueachievements.com
- Registration: Optional but required for achievements/gamerscore tracking
- Launched: March, 2008
- Current status: Online

TrueAchievements is a website that tracks player's achievements and Gamerscore for games and applications for Xbox Live-supporting platforms, including Xbox Series X/S, Xbox One, Xbox 360, Windows Phone, Games for Windows - Live, Windows 7, Windows 8, Windows 10 and Windows 11. It is published by TrueGaming Network, which also publishes the TrueSteamAchievements and TrueTrophies sister websites, catering respectively to Valve's PC platform, Steam, and Sony's PlayStation. TrueAchievements uses a method of assessment titled "TrueAchievement" score, in addition to Xbox network Gamerscore. The site is a member of the Xbox Community Developer Program, and as of July 2019, TrueAchievements has over 400,000 registered users including the two highest-scoring Xbox players. In 2014, the TrueAchievements Xbox One application was made available to allow users to access several of the site's features directly on their consoles. TrueAchievements reached 1,000,000 registered users in February 2023, and registers 6 million monthly unique visitors and 25 million pageviews every month. It is the second most visited Xbox-related website after www.xbox.com.

== Website ==
TrueAchievements was designed and programmed by Richard Stone, and launched in March 2008. It was conceptualized when Richard Stone determined that the current GamerScore system devised by Microsoft was inherently unbalanced; it would sometimes appear to offer only a few points for difficult tasks in-game, and many points for somewhat trivial tasks in-game. His solution was to allocate points based on rarity of the achievement – that is, how many other players already had that particular achievement. If many players had a particular achievement, it would be considered common and therefore have a lower score. If not many players had a particular achievement, it would be considered rare and given a higher score.

As of 2019 the website is hosted by RapidSwitch on three leased servers at its Maidenhead Datacentre, and receives 850,000 unique visitors a month and around 20 million monthly page views. The majority of content, including game solutions and walkthroughs, are primarily provided by the users of the site. The site is also staffed by a number of unpaid volunteers who oversee the moderation of the user content, game walkthroughs, reviews and other editorials. The website uses advertising to support its operations, as well as a paid "Pro" subscription option for users that wish to remove the advertising and gain other additional benefits.

== TrueAchievement score ==
TrueAchievement score is obtained by taking the base Gamerscore value of an achievement and multiplying it by its rarity, resulting in a more accurate representation of skill required to obtain it.

$Score_{TA}=Score_{GS}*\sqrt{T_{game} \over T_{ach}}$

Where $Score_{GS}$ is the actual Gamerscore, $T_{game}$ is the number of members who are tracked as owning the game (defined as having at least one achievement for that game), $T_{ach}$ is the number of members who are tracked as having that specific achievement.

=== An example ===
On 27 December 2011, The game The Elder Scrolls V: Skyrim had 47,115 tracked owners. Of those owners, 25,314 of them had earned the achievement "Explorer", which is worth 40 Gamerscore. Therefore, that achievement had, at that point in time, a TAScore of

$40\sqrt{47115 / 25314} = 40\sqrt{1.86} = 40*1.36 \approx 54$

Because the TrueAchievement score is dependent on the number of people who currently have an achievement, it can change over time, as more people become tracked as having the game, or more people who have the game earn this achievement.

The TrueAchievement score is displayed on user's pages, along with other pertinent information such as their Gamerscore, the number of achievements they have unlocked, their most recent achievements and played games, and other customizable information.

== Features ==
TrueAchievements has several features including:

- Achievement tracking, which lists achievements earned, as well as ones placed on a "to-do list."
- A friends list that tracks friends' TrueAchievement score and Gamerscore, as well as an updated feed of their friend's most recently completed achievements and games.
- Solutions, walkthroughs and reviews to games submitted by users.
- Gaming Sessions - an automated system that assists gamers in arranging play with each other for fun, to help earn achievements, or competitive gameplay.
- Badges awarded both for Gamerscore milestones as well as community interaction.
- Forums for every game, for individual leaderboards, and for the main topics of the site.
- Leaderboards, that compare a variety of stats with gamers in a set group, such as regional leaderboards or user-created leaderboards.
- An individual stats page for every user, detailing the most popular genres played, more detailed information on achievements, and timeline-based graphs for tracking improvement and score gains.
- A chat room that allows users to coordinate matchmaking in real time.
- User blogs to allow users to share their thoughts on gaming and other topics.
