= Legendo Entertainment =

Sweden-based entertainment company

- Formerly: Iridon Interactive (1998–2005)
- Type: Private
- Industry: Animation, music, comics, video games
- Founded: February 25, 1998
- Founder: Björn Larsson
- Defunct: February 2026
- Headquarters: Stockholm, Sweden
- Key people: Björn Larsson (CEO and executive producer)
- Brands: Dracula Twins; Pure Pinball; Wolfwar Saga
- Website: https://legendo.com

Legendo Entertainment was a Sweden-based entertainment company, led by CEO Björn Larsson. Founded as Iridon Interactive in 1998, the company adopted its current title in 2005. Until late 2018, Legendo Entertainment was a dedicated video game company, taking on the creation, development and publishing of various third-party titles through external development teams; since 2018, the company has taken on several multimedia projects, including comics, music, and animation. The company went bankrupt in February 2026, and quietly ceased operations.

== History ==
The developer, under its original name, Iridon Interactive AB, was registered as a business on February 25, 1998.

One of the titles that Iridon Interactive has released was Wanted Guns (Aka. Wanted: Dead or Alive in USA) in several regions including the US in 2004.

Drawing inspiration predominantly from folklore, mythology, alternative science, classic novels and historical events, Legendo Entertainment has produced such works as Dracula Twins, which pays homage to classic literary works by Bram Stoker, Three Musketeers: One For All! which is a nod to Alexandre Dumas, as well as the Attack on Pearl Harbor and Pearl Harbor Trilogy series, inspired by the events of World War II. Legendo's most recent game was FCB Pinball (2014), a digital pinball game featuring a football theme.

Legendo Entertainment social media icon

In late 2018, Legendo Entertainment began to take on various cross-media projects, separating the company into five departments: Legendo Games, Legendo Comics, Legendo Music, Legendo Media, and Legendo Animation. Legendo Comics's first literary release, Wolfwar Saga: Varangian, is a graphic essay written by Philip Madden and Björn Larsson.

Several games were in development at Legendo, including Dracula Twins R2: School's Out, the sequel to Dracula Twins, and Valhalla Tactics: Vikings & Varangians, a turn-based tabletop strategy game, both for Nintendo Switch, Windows, Xbox One, and Xbox Series X/S. Muskerados: The Three Musketeers Redemastered, an action game based on the novel The Three Musketeers, was in development for PlayStation 5 and Xbox Series X/S.

Legendo Entertainment was also developing its debut animation project, Dracula Twins: Vampire Vacademy, based on the Dracula Twins video games. It was scheduled for release in 2024.

Legendo Entertainment AB filed for bankruptcy in November 2, 2024. It then ceased operations in 2026.

== Video games ==
=== As Iridon Interactive ===
- 1997 – Dink Smallwood (PC)
- 1998 – Excessive Speed (PC)
- 1999 – Total Soccer 2000 (PC)
- 2000 – Akimbo: Kung-Fu Hero (PC)
- 2001 – Monster Truck Rumble (PC)
- 2002 – Turbo Turtle Adventure (GBA)
- 2003 – Monster Truck Fury (Windows 98 and above)
- 2003 – Moomin and the Lost Rainbow (GBA) (unreleased)
- 2003 – Pure Pinball (PC)
- 2004 – Wanted Guns (PC)
- 2004 – Pure Pinball (Xbox)
- 2004 – Billy Blade and the Temple of Time (PC)
- 2005 – Heavyweight Thunder (PC)

=== As Legendo Entertainment ===
- 2005 – The Three Musketeers (Windows XP and Windows Vista)
- 2006 – Dracula Twins (Windows XP and Windows Vista)
- 2007 – Attack on Pearl Harbor (Windows XP and Windows Vista)
- 2008 – Becky & Tim: Spooky Spirits (Windows XP and Windows Vista)
- 2009 – The Three Musketeers: One for all! (WiiWare)
- 2009 – Spooky Spirits: Puzzle Drop!! (iPhone) (co-developed with Innogiant)
- 2010 – Pearl Harbor Trilogy - 1941: Red Sun Rising (WiiWare)
- 2011 – Ghost Mania (WiiWare)
- 2011 – The Three Musketeers: One for all! (Mac App Store)
- 2012 – Fortune Winds: Ancient Trader (Windows and Mac App Store)
- 2014 – FCB Pinball: The Official Pinball of FC Barcelona (iPhone/iPad)

==== Upcoming ====
- Dracula Twins R2: School's Out! (Nintendo Switch, Windows, Xbox One, Xbox Series X/S)
- Muskerados: The Three Musketeers Redemastered (PlayStation 5, Xbox Series X/S)
- Valhalla Tactics: Vikings & Varangians (Nintendo Switch, Windows, Xbox One, Xbox Series X/S)
