= Björn Larsson =

Swedish game director/designer and executive producer

- Born: 12 May 1975 (age 51)
- Occupations: Game designer, executive producer

Björn Larsson (born 12 May 1975) is a Swedish game director, executive producer and game designer. Larsson got involved in creating video games shortly after getting his first computer in the mid-1980s (a Commodore 64). Larsson became professionally involved in games starting in the mid-1990s working in retail, and subsequently founded Iridon Interactive in 1998 publishing and producing titles including Total Soccer 2000 and Pure Pinball. In 2005, Larsson rebranded Iridon to Legendo Entertainment to focus on computer and video games based on myths and historical events. Notable titles include The Three Musketeers and Attack on Pearl Harbor.

== Games ==
- 1997 – Dink Smallwood (PC)
- 1998 – Excessive Speed (PC)
- 1999 – Total Soccer 2000 (PC)
- 2000 – Akimbo: Kung-Fu Hero (PC)
- 2002 – Turbo Turtle Adventure (GBA)
- 2004 – Pure Pinball (Xbox)
- 2007 – Attack on Pearl Harbor (Windows XP and Windows Vista)
- 2009 – The Three Musketeers: One for all! (WiiWare)
- 2010 – Pearl Harbor Trilogy - 1941: Red Sun Rising (WiiWare)
- 2011 – Ghost Mania (WiiWare)
- 2011 – The Three Musketeers: One for all! (Mac App Store)
- 2012 – Fortune Winds: Ancient Trader (Mac App Store)
- 2017 - Flying Tigers: Shadows over China (PC)
- 2018 - Reader Rabbit: Jumpsmarter (iOS, Apple TV, macOS)
