= Attack on Pearl Harbor (video game) =

2007 video game

- Developer: Legendo Entertainment (Note: Co-developed with 3DIVISION and Arcade Moon)
- Publishers: Ascaron; CDV Software (Note: CDV Software published the game in North America.)
- Directors: Péter Nagy; Björn Larsson
- Producer: Björn Larsson
- Designers: Chris Bateman; Neil Bundy; Björn Larsson
- Programmer: Peter Adamčík
- Writers: James Birrel; Martin Korda
- Composers: Pierre Gerwig Langer; Alexander Röder
- Platform: Windows
- Release: UK: 22 June 2007; NA: 6 August 2007; AU: 9 August 2007
- Genres: Action-adventure, combat flight simulation
- Modes: Single-player, multiplayer

Attack on Pearl Harbor is a combat flight simulation game developed by Legendo Entertainment and published by Ascaron and CDV Software. The game is based on the Attack on Pearl Harbor and the following Battles of Wake Island, Midway, and the Coral Sea. The game is presented through a third-person perspective. In the single-player campaign, the players assumes control of either a United States Army Air Force pilot or an Imperial Japanese Navy pilot. The multiplayer component allows players to engage in both cooperative and competitive gameplay.

The game was released for Windows in 2007. It received mixed reviews from critics, who generally approved of the gameplay, controls, and graphics, though some were divided on the overall narrative and historical accuracy. The game was later released for WiiWare in July 2010 as Pearl Harbor Trilogy – 1941: Red Sun Rising.

== Gameplay ==
The player assumes control of a fictional pilot during the Attack on Pearl Harbor.

Attack on Pearl Harbor is a combat flight simulation game that is played from a third-person perspective. In the game's single-player campaign, the player assumes control of one of two fictional pilots: United States Army Air Forces pilot Douglas Knox or Imperial Japanese Navy pilot Zenji Yamada. Both pilots have two single-player campaigns each, beginning during the Attack on Pearl Harbor and chronologically featuring the key battles that followed, including the Battle of Wake Island, Battle of Midway, and Battle of the Coral Sea. The game also features operations prior to the Battle of the Santa Cruz Islands and the Battle of Okinawa for both pilots. The game's cutscenes are presented in a comic book-like fashion.

The player assumes control of several historic aircraft, including the Douglas SBD Dauntless, Aichi D3A, Vought F4U Corsair, and Mitsubishi A6M Zero. If the player fails a mission, planes are deducted from their reserve, and the campaign ends in defeat once all planes are deducted. Aircraft carry unlimited ammunition, limited only by overheating for machine guns and reloading times for rockets, bombs, and torpedoes. The player can view different perspectives of the plane, such as a wing view and a chase view.

The single-player component also features a mode titled Dogfight, wherein the player selects the venue, weather conditions, aircraft type, and difficulty. The game mode endless spawns AI aircraft which attack the player. The player can select from three possible victory conditions: Time Attack, where they must survive for a certain time limit; King of the Sky, where a certain number of enemy craft must be destroyed; or Fly and Die, wherein the game ends when the player is shot down. The online multiplayer mode for Attack on Pearl Harbor allows up to twelve players to compete cooperatively and competitively. The multiplayer component features two game modes: Dogfight, in which the last plane flying wins; and Team Dogfight, in which the last surviving team wins.

== Release ==
Attack on Pearl Harbor was produced by Legendo Entertainment and co-developed with 3DIVISION and Arcade Moon, and was published by Ascaron worldwide and by CDV Software in North America. A single-player demo was released on the game's website on 18 May 2007; according to CDV Software, it received more than 175,000 downloads within two weeks. The game was submitted for manufacturing in the United States on 5 July 2007. It was released in the United Kingdom on 22 June, in North America on 6 August, and in Australia on 9 August; it became available on Steam on 20 August. The game's soundtrack was published on streaming platforms by Mad Villa Tunez on 30 November 2012.

== Reception ==
Reception

Aggregate score
Aggregator	Score
Metacritic	64/100

Review scores
Publication	Score
4Players	66%
Eurogamer	5/10
Gamekult	4/10
GameSpot	7/10
GameZone	7.2/10
IGN	4.6/10
Jeuxvideo.com	10/20
PALGN	7.5/10
PC Gamer (UK)	78%
PC Gamer (US)	68%

Attack on Pearl Harbor received "mixed or average reviews", according to review aggregator Metacritic. Tristan Kalogeropoulos of PALGN wrote the game offers "great 'arcadey' action and some incredibly fun aerial combat". In a retrospective piece, John Walker of Rock Paper Shotgun praised the satisfaction of combat. Conversely, IGN's Charles Onyett concluded that the game "manage[s] to take something as interesting as World War II's air battle over the Pacific and turn it into something as repetitive as bouncing a tennis ball against a wall".

PALGN's Kalogeropoulos lauded the enjoyment of the gameplay and simplicity of the controls. Eurogamer's Darren Allen described them as "extremely basic, but then they're supposed to be", though he found the missions overly similar. Andy Mahood of PC Gamer (US) found the controls "easy to master" but the environments "surprisingly small". Johnathan Neuls of Ars Technica described the game's speed controls as "a mess" due to their unpredictability.

PC Gamer's Mahood described the graphics as "lush", and GameZone's Michael Lafferty called them "terrific", praising the satisfaction of effective combat. PALGN's Kalogeropoulos noted they are "not overly complicated but ... do a great job of portraying the skies of World War II". Ars Technica's Neuls commended the historical accuracy of the plane designs. GameSpot's Brett Todd found the terrain "a bit odd-looking" but commended the technical performance, and John Walker of PC Gamer (UK) praised the weather and smoke effects, but criticized the lack of detail on buildings and aircraft.

PALGN's Kalogeropoulos felt the casual nature of the historical missions fit well with the overall content. GameSpot's Todd described the missions as "formulaic" but entertaining, preferring the campaign missions over the empty online mode. Neuls of Ars Technica criticized the story and historical accuracy, describing it as the "Cliff Notes version" of the battle. IGN's Onyett described the action as "so undemanding that it gets boring within about 10 minutes", particularly criticizing the repetition of the missions. PC Gamer's Walker criticized the simplicity and repetition of the missions, and Jeuxvideo.com's Frédéric Fau felt they were uninteresting and the atmosphere unengaging. 4Players' Bodo Naser enjoyed the short mission length but thought they soon became tiring. Gamekult's Gaël Fouquet considered the game boring even in multiplayer, though he found hunting down enemy planes with a mouse click occasionally amusing.
