= Operation Musketeer =

Operation Musketeer may refer to:

- US military plans for the Philippines campaign (1944–1945)
- Operation Musketeer (1956), the Anglo-French invasion of Egypt to capture the Suez Canal in 1956
- Operation Musketeer (nuclear test), a series of underground nuclear tests conducted by the United States in Nevada in 1985-87
