= Dink Smallwood =

1998 video game

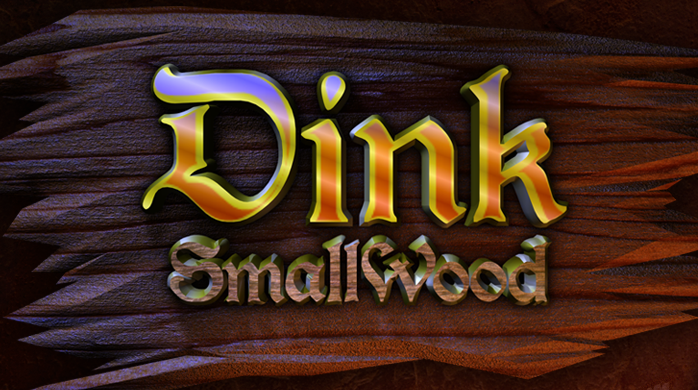
- Developer: Robinson Technologies
- Publisher: EU: Iridon Interactive
- Designer: Seth Robinson
- Platforms: Windows, Linux, OS X, PlayStation Portable, iOS, Android
- Release: 1998
- Genre: Action role-playing game
- Mode: Single player

Dink Smallwood is an action role-playing video game developed by Robinson Technologies at the time consisting of Seth Robinson, Justin Martin, and Greg Smith. It was first released in 1998 before being released as freeware on October 17, 1999. Mitch Brink composed several of the game's music tracks while others are MIDI forms of classical music such as Debussy's "Reverie". The game has a small but constant fan following that continues to develop add-ons for the game more than two decades after its release. The game is also notable for its humorous dialogue and surrealistic themes in various scenes between the gameplay.

== Gameplay ==
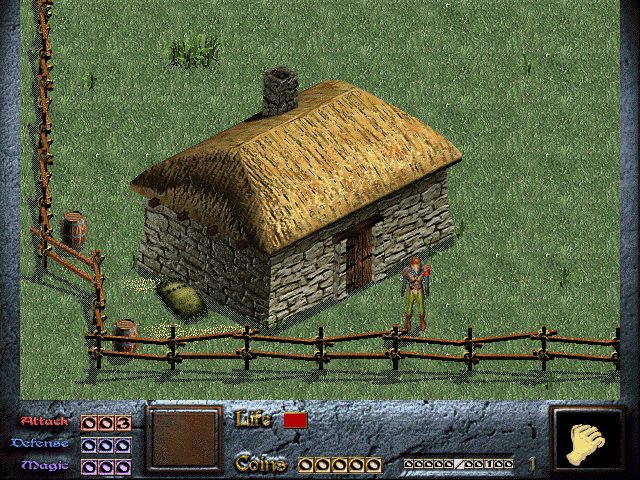
The house of Dink Smallwood at the start of the game, before it burns down.

The game centers on Dink, a pig farmer-turned-hero who embarks on various quests throughout his world. The game features isometric, Diablo-like gameplay, including weapons, items, and magic. The game has a satirical off-color slant, including everything from a fiercely abusive uncle to a town that worships ducks. Dink is never freed from the grievances of being a pig farmer, a fact he is far too often reminded of by his nemesis, Milder Flatstomp.

== Storyline ==
Dink starts out as a pig farmer, living a normal life in Stonebrook, his home village. His father is said to have disappeared, leaving him behind in a small village with his mother. Somehow, as he is outside, his house burns down and his mother is killed. He is then told to go out of his village into the world to find his aunt and start living a new life with her. Along the way, he hears of a powerful and sinister group known as the Cast whose nefarious deeds are threatening the kingdom. Dink eventually makes it his quest to defeat this mysterious cult. After that, he goes in the Darklands to kill the mighty evil, Seth.

== History ==
=== Development ===
Dink Smallwood was developed by Robinson Technologies in the mid 1990s at the time where Seth Robinson, Justin Martin, and Greg Smith were involved. Mitch Brink composed several of the game's music tracks. The game was initially released in 1997 for purchase in the United States and Europe. The game could be purchased from retail stores in Europe via European publisher Iridon Interactive, though Robinson Technologies did not secure a publisher for the United States, so this required them to sell to this region via mail order at the price of $25 (including shipping). The game was developed in one year with a budget of around $16,000.

=== Freeware release ===
By the summer of 1999, Robinson Technologies had sold out of all their copies of Dink Smallwood and claimed that there were no plans to publish more copies. It was announced a short time later that the game would be distributed as freeware, and the freeware version of Dink Smallwood was released on October 17, 1999.

=== Source code release ===
Shortly after the freeware release, fans of the game often asked Seth Robinson if he had any plans to release the game's source code. Seth generally replied "no." He commonly cited the game's sloppy and embarrassing coding as a reason for withholding the source from the community. After years of being pressed to do so, Seth finally decided to release the source code on July 17, 2003 under a Zlib-inspired own license without the content which was kept proprietary freeware. In 2008, the artwork was published (without some sounds) under a Zlib license.

A handful of projects focused on upgrading or porting Dink Smallwood have surfaced, most of them being canceled or postponed indefinitely.

=== Community-made Dink 1.08 ===
In 2005, Seth Robinson asked Dan "redink1" Walma, the owner of the Dink Network fan site, to create a new patch for Dink Smallwood. Robinson hoped that the numerous longstanding bugs in Dink would be fixed and the experience for new players would be streamlined. After eight-and-a-half months of development and numerous builds of alpha, beta, and release candidate testing involving the community, Dink Smallwood 1.08 was released as community-fixed version on March 10, 2006.

=== GNU FreeDink ===
The GNU GPL licensed GNU FreeDink fork, which is developed under the GNU Project umbrella, works on replacing the last proprietary sounds to make the game completely free software. GNU FreeDink was ported to a variety of platforms including the PlayStation Portable, Linux, AmigaOS 4 and Mac OS X among others. GNU Freedink is based on the original v1.07 source code release, but has modes to run like v1.08. It is continuously updated and is the most successful source port so far.

DFArc2, a small GTK+ utility program, makes it easy to play and manage the Dink Smallwood game and its numerous Dink Modules (or D-Mods).

=== Dink Smallwood HD ===
As of December 16, 2011, a new version of Dink Smallwood called "Dink Smallwood HD" has been developed for iPhone, iPad, Android, Windows XP/Vista/7, webOS and Mac OS X by Seth Robinson. In the Windows/Mac/Android versions, it is also possible to play the fan-made D-Mods. A new feature is instant-load and instant-save where the player can save and load the game at any point - as opposed to the original game where saving was only possible at specific points in the game.

In October 2017 the HD version became fully free and open source too. The source code became available on GitHub shortly after.

== Modification ==
Two level editors exist for Dink Smallwood. The original level editor, developed by Robinson Technologies, is DinkEdit, which is included with the game, and the second level editor is WinDinkEdit which was developed by fans of the game. The freeware game comes with its own D-Mod (short for Dink Module), Mystery Island, which follows Dink's adventures after his victory in the original story. D-Mods can be heavily customized, and some of them are very different from the original game. Many D-Mods, some of them much longer than the original game, can be found online.

DinkEdit is a modal application that can be used to create a new world. The game world consists of at most 768 screens and each screen can have at most a hundred editor-placed sprites. Among other tasks, the editor can be used to specify music for a screen, assign scripts to sprites and to decorate the game world. WinDinkEdit is a level editor for Windows which enables the D-Mod author to perform the same tasks in a graphical environment.

The DinkC scripting language has a C-like syntax. Variables are prefixed with an ampersand, &, and single line comments are supported with //. Each sprite in the game can have a script attached to it which will be used to determine the behavior and appearance of the sprite. The engine calls various functions on certain events; for example, the 'main', 'talk' and 'hit' functions of a script will respectively be called upon loading the screen, when the player talks to the sprite and when the player hits the sprite. Each screen can also have a script attached to it which can be used for initialization of the screen or other events.

== Reception ==
Reception

Aggregate score
Aggregator	Score
GameRankings	64% (based on 3 reviews)

Review score
Publication	Score
GamePro	3.5/5

Computer Gaming World Issue #189 featured Dink Smallwood in the section "The Good", saying "Now here is something totally refreshing". While compared to other role-playing games, Dink Smallwood was praised for its humour, being described as “a spoonful of Zelda,…a dash of Monkey Island and a pinch of Diablo.” The humour was described as the one good aspect of the game and was found quite entertaining. However, with other elements letting the game down, the humour only made Dink Smallwood suitable as "an inexpensive stopgap". The dialogue used when interacting with NPCs was criticised for containing errors as well as having little influence on the overall outcome of the game. Graphical errors were also listed, with the player character getting stuck on scenery and unable to move, or NPCs or monsters drifting through walls. The lack of interaction between NPCs and monsters was also referenced, with NPCs attempting to hold conversations while the player is in combat. Although Dink Smallwood was described as having little replay value on its own, the inclusion of editing software and the wide availability of user-generated content were noted as improving on this.

=== References and impact ===
In Baldur's Gate: Tales of the Sword Coast, a reference to Dink Smallwood can be found: "(Facetiously) I am Dinkamus Littlelog and I come in search of the holy groundhog.".

In Borderlands' first DLC, The Zombie Island of Dr. Ned, an adventurer named Dirk Smallwood is part of a missing "Misery Bus" crew parodying Scooby-Doo.

== See also ==
- List of open source games
