= The Three Musketeers: One for All! =

2009 video game

- Developer: Legendo Entertainment
- Publisher: Legendo Entertainment
- Producer: Björn Larsson
- Designer: Jan Almqvist
- Platform: Wii (WiiWare)
- Release: NA: July 27, 2009; EU: July 31, 2009; AU: July 31, 2009
- Genre: Platform
- Mode: Single-player

The Three Musketeers: One for All! is a WiiWare version of The Three Musketeers by Legendo Entertainment and it was released in North America on July 27, 2009 and in the PAL regions on July 31, 2009.

== Gameplay ==
The game, which features two-dimensional movement through a cartoonish three-dimensional environment, is loosely based on the 1844 Alexandre Dumas, père classic The Three Musketeers. In the game, the player controls Porthos in an attempt to save his kidnapped companions.

== Reception ==
The PC version of the game was nominated for a 2006 Swedish Game Award in the category Family Game of the Year. The WiiWare version holds an average score of 53 from metacritic.
