= Revenge of the Musketeers =

Revenge of the Musketeers may refer to

- Revenge of the Musketeers (1964 film)
- Revenge of the Musketeers (1994 film)
