= The Four Musketeers =

The Four Musketeers may refer to:

- The principal characters in the Alexandre Dumas novel The Three Musketeers and its sequels once D'Artagnan is added as the fourth musketeer
- The Four Musketeers (tennis), French tennis players who dominated the game in the second half of the 1920s and early 1930s
- The Four Musketeers (1934 film), a German drama directed by Heinz Paul unrelated to the Dumas novels
- The Four Musketeers (1936 film), an Italian adventure film directed by Carlo Campogalliani
- The Four Musketeers (1963 film), an Italian-French film directed by Carlo Ludovico Bragaglia
- The Four Musketeers (1974 film), a film by Richard Lester
- The Four Musketeers (musical), a musical with a score by Laurie Johnson and lyrics by Herbert Kretzmer
- The Four Musketeers, fictional characters in Eric Flint's 1632 series

== See also ==
- The Fourth Musketeer, a 1923 American silent drama film
