= Travian (disambiguation) =

Travian may refer to:

- Travian, a browser game
- Travian Games, a German browser game developer
- Travian Robertson, an American football player
- Travian Smith, a former American football player
