= Z-Netz =

Overview of the Z-Netz BBS network in Germany as of January 1993 with roughly 280 BBS's

The Z-Netz was a German BBS network applying store and forward mechanisms to provide their users with e-mail and discussion groups. It can be compared to the U.S. based WWIV network or the international FidoNet.

The technical base for the Z-Netz was the software "Zerberus". Initially the network was called "Zerberus Netz" or just "Zerberus". When other software applying the "ZConnect" data transfer method became available, the network was renamed to "Z-Netz" to reflect that.

"Zerberus" was developed since 1984. It was later maintained by the "Zerberus GmbH", which was founded in 1992 and dissolved in 1999.

Several Z-Netz operators maintained gateways into other networks, most notably the Usenet, and even forwarded Z-Netz e-mail to the Internet and vice versa. With internet access becoming easily available in Germany in the late 90s the Z-Netz began to vanish.
