= Tagboard =

A tagboard is a small message board on a website also called a shoutbox.

Tagboard may also refer to:

- D-21 Tagboard, a reconnaissance drone aircraft
- A form of paperboard
- Terminal strips, used in early electronics
- T.A.G., a DOS-based bulletin board system (BBS) software program, released from 1986 to 2000
