= Interdictor Cruiser =

Interdictor Cruiser may refer to:

- A large ship in the TradeWars 2002 online game
- One of several types of starships in Star Wars; see List of Star Wars capital ships
