= My Lands =

2010 video game

- Developer: Elyland
- Platforms: Microsoft Windows, OS X, Android, iOS
- Release: 2010
- Genres: Turn-based strategy massively multiplayer online game
- Mode: Co-op mode; multiplayer

My Lands (also known as mlgame, ML) is a browser-based multiplayer game in the genre of military-economic real-time strategy set in a fantasy world. The developers from the Elyland company promote My Lands as the very first browser MMOG. My Lands enjoys up to 200,000 active players and has been translated into over 20 languages. The main goals of the game consist of developing one's own kingdom, training army units, interacting with other players (their kingdoms), and gaining Black Gems in various ways.

== Gameplay ==
My Lands is written in the Java language and is powered by flash. The game universe is a fantasy one. In My Lands, there are 4 races: elves, drow, demons, knights. All races are divided into 2 factions — Light Faction and Dark Faction. Players may attack their own race, however those who do so lose the support of their faction and become the so-called renegades for a period of time. The underlying principle of the game is quite common: each player is given a settlement, which needs to be developed, supplied with resources and defended against enemies. This MMORPG features establishing in-game unions — the clans. The «gold rush» effect is encouraged by Black Gems, the game currency for purchasing various improvements.

=== Races ===
In the My Lands world, there are 4 races, each one with its own distinctive features, advantages and unique units.

- Demons inhabit lifeless scorched volcanoes, have the highest stone mining speed, their special units include Demonesses, the unique mercenaries. Demons are allied with Drow.
- Drow dwell in the caves of the Cursed Forrest, skilled in mining iron and wood, their special unit is Arachnid, the war mage. In cahoots with Demons.
- Elves is a peace loving race residing in the Magic Forest; harvest the most wood, their special unit is Healer. Allied with Knights.
- Knights represent the Light Faction, have the highest rates of winning gold and very capacious warehouses, their special units – the Carriers – stand out for their enormous backpacks. Allied with Elves.

The game universe is divided into two big factions – the Light Faction (Knights and Elves) and the Dark Faction (Demons and Drow).

=== Cities and villages ===
The very first city automatically becomes the capital of the player's kingdom. The city can be upgraded to 5th level which is the maximum level. Each city has 4 neighboring villages, in which buildings can be constructed. Cities cannot be seized, however players can capture Outer Domains belonging to other players. The capital has 51 cells for constructing buildings and cannot be removed as all rewards for quests are automatically placed in this exact city. However the capital status can be transferred to another city by means of studying the «Capital transfer» science. As the science studies continue, another 5 cities can be established. Each new city has 22 cells in the beginning. By means of upgrading the Main Building, the number of cells inside the city wall can be increased. However the city size cannot exceed the initial number of cells on the field this city was founded on. The player can remove any city, except for capital, at that all its buildings will be lost and troops leave for player's nearest city.

=== Outer domains and Ruins ===
In My Lands, Outer domains and Ruins cannot be seen on the map, unless discovered by player's Explorer units. The discovered objects are visible only to the player who discovered them and remain invisible to other players, unless they discover them too. Outer domains mine various types of resources:

- Stone mine
- Iron mine
- Gold mine
- Pit
- Salt Lake
- Grail

Players can pillage Outer Estates (except for Salt Lakes and Grails), seizing half of their resources and population. To be able to seize an Outer domain, one needs to study the «Outer domains» science first. Other players can defend these domains and construct defensive buildings in there. In order to succeed in seizing such a domain, those buildings must be destroyed.

=== Resources ===
My Lands is an economic MMO RPG, therefore its players will need to mine and control large amounts of resources.

- Wood is harvested by the Main Building of the city and also by the Woodcutter cabin.
- Crops are produced by Windmills.
- Stone is mined in Stone Quarries, in the Main Buildings of Stone mines and sometimes in Pits.
- Gold is produced in the following buildings: Trading Post, Gold Plant, Main Buildings of Gold mines and sometimes of Pits.
- Iron is won in Iron mines, in the Main Buildings of Iron mines and sometimes of Pits.
- Black Gems are a special resource in My Lands, which can be gained in the course of the game.

The production speed for resources may vary depending on the parameters of the race chosen by player and on terrain mining bonuses.

=== Black Gems ===
Black Gems is the in-game My Lands currency which is bound to player's account, displayed in the upper right corner of the screen and acts as player's financial account. Black Gems can be earned in the course of the game and presented to other players. There are several ways to gain them in-game:

- Capturing a Salt Lake. The main building in these Outer domains mine BG.
- Black Gems can be robbed in Ruins by slaying all the monsters inside first.
- Black Gems can be gained in the economical way by buying them for gold at the Auction (the Market building).

Black Gems cannot be robbed from players. Black Gems can be bought for real money, in order to speed up army training, city upgrades and for accelerated science studying which allows to advance faster in the game and to reinforce one's own kingdom.

=== Sciences ===
Sciences play a very important role in the game. They mark player's progress in the game: army, economy and player bonuses. The science studies require resources and time. To start studying a science, one needs to build one or a couple of buildings Alchemist Labs and choose the science to be studied in the Science window. Science is a resource common for all player's domains. The more Alchemist Labs are constructed, the higher is the science studying speed.

=== Heroes ===
Heroes are a unique war unit comparable to heroes from Travian. These units can lead player's army, ensure some remarkable bonuses and enable player to cast Scrolls and use Artifacts. In order to hire a hero, one must study the Hero managing science, construct the Tavern building and achieve the Captain rank.

=== Tournaments ===
Tournaments have been part of the My Lands gameplay from the very beginning. As years passed by, the tournaments have only evolved further. In 2013 a brand new activity called “Underground Lakes Capture” was introduced to the game. Then as now, only advanced players with the title Suzerain can participate in the tournament. This competition targets capturing and defending the most Underground Lakes by the end of the tournament.

=== Runes ===
Runes are magic stones providing a passive bonus to players by means of engraving runic signs on the Artifacts. In order to rob runes in Stonehenges and perform magic rites, one needs to study the second level of the Alchemy science first. Runes can also be arranged in magical words. Special combinations of runes if engraved on an Artifact provide additional game bonuses to Heroes. Each runic word is meant for only 1 certain type of artifact (sword, armor, etc.) and remains inactive if engraved on an artifact of a different type.

=== Interaction between players ===
My Lands provides a broad array of interactive tools and possibilities for cooperation between players. The game features a global map with cities, in-game post, trading at the auction and market. Players' clan unions can be officially at war or sign a truce. Players can also become mentors for other players and help them master the art of developing a flourishing kingdom.

== Platforms and technologies ==
My Lands is supported by all Windows browsers and compatible with OS X. It is also available for Android and iOS. Its Steam version was released in 2014, along with several DLC packages. There is also a community dedicated to My Lands on Steam.

== Awards and reviews ==
The game was awarded the best browser-based game of 2011 by #ConfOG.
