= Renegade (BBS) =

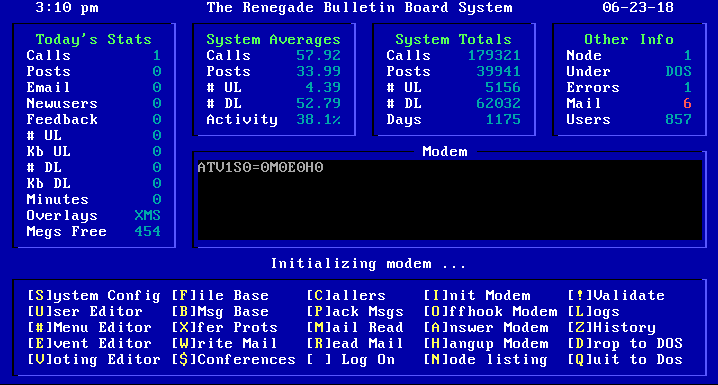
- Developers: Cott Lang, Miri Spence, Gary Hall, Jeff Herrings, T.J. McMillen, Chris Hoppman, Lee Palmer, Lee Woodridge, (Rick Parrish Win32 Ports Only)
- Initial release: June 1991; 34 years ago
- Stable release: 1.40/DOS / March 1, 2026; 16 days ago
- Written in: Turbo Pascal
- Operating system: DOS
- Type: Bulletin Board System
- Website: www.rgbbs.info

Renegade is a freeware bulletin board system (BBS) written for IBM PC-compatible computers running MS-DOS that gained popularity among hobbyist BBSes in the early to mid 1990s. It was originally written by Cott Lang in Turbo Pascal, optimized with assembly language, based on the source code of Telegard, which was in turn based on the earlier WWIV.

== Transfer of control ==
On April 23, 1997, after the decline of BBS popularity, Lang ceased development work on Renegade and passed it on to two Renegade BBS utility authors: Miri Spence and Gary Hall. Spence and Hall maintained Renegade for three years, releasing three updates with their new, ordinal date version scheme.

Jeff Herrings, another former third-party software developer, was handed the source by Spence in January 2000 after offering help when he found there was no Y2K-compliant version of the software. Herrings released a public alpha version of Renegade in March 2000 addressing Y2K-compliance problems. He stepped down as active programmer in October 2001 citing lack of time and desire.

Spence eventually handed the program over to Corey Snow in 2002, who intended to release an open-source, Java-based clone of the software which never saw the light of day.

T.J. McMillen received the source code in October 2003 from Miri Spence in a plea to have some much needed features added to Renegade. McMillen then added the help of Chris Hoppman, one of the few remaining Renegade BBS operators around. Together they released a few updates which addressed bugs and debuted some new features before Hoppman lost interest. Hoppman stepped down from the project in 2004 and is no longer involved. This left McMillen, once again, alone to carry on the Renegade code.

Herrings released his Y2K-compliant source code to the public via the Dreamland BBS in September 2005 citing he believed it was right to share a software he deemed mostly abandoned in hopes that it would see further and more active development. He claimed that due to a perceived immoral injustice by Miri Spence, he was no longer under any moral obligation to a previous agreement not to release the source code.

With little free time, Renegade idled for more than a year until April 2006 when McMillen (also known as Exodus) added the talent of Lee Palmer to the Renegade team to replace Hoppman. Palmer (also known as Nuclear) is a former third-party software developer for the T.A.G. Bulletin Board System. Palmer disappeared sometime around 2012 and has not been heard from. McMillen was once again the lone code holder.

In 2013, McMillen released the v1.19/DOS Source code on GitHub in hopes someone would add to it. No one stepped up in 7+ years, so McMillen once again resurfaced in 2020 to release v1.22/DOS. With some time on his hands due to the pandemic, McMillen was able to hash out v1.25/DOS on May 16, 2021.

Lee Woodridge was added to the RG Development Team in September 2021. Woodridge had added quite a few fixes and updates to his fork of the v1.19a/DOS code. Woodridge was asked to join and to merge his fork with the v1.25/DOS code. Once this was completed v1.30/DOS and v1.33/DOS were released.

Lee Woodridge has seemed to given up coding sometime back in 2024. McMillen took some renewed interested during Christmas break 2025 and wrote some utilities for the current Renegade that might peak some interest. After these were completed, he returned to updating Renegade.

v1.40 was released on March 1, 2026. This updated added Lightbar File Listings with tagging and scrolling text view internal archive viewers. There is also lightbar message area reading. Also the ability to import Y2K and older .MNU files into the Menu system to use old utils. New Alpha test sites also show lightbar driven Nodelist viewer/search internal to Renegade for the next release as well.

== Current information ==
The current work is now being coded under 'The Renegade Development Team' name.

Version 1.40 for DOS Full Install and Upgrade versions were released on March 1, 2026.

There are multiple utilities on www.rgbbs.info for the current release. Check the downloads section

== See also ==
- WWIV
- Telegard
