= Star Trader =

1974 video game

- Developer: Dave Kaufman
- Platform: Computer
- Release: January 1974
- Genre: Space trading

Star Trader is a 1974 video game and an early example of the space trading genre. The game involves players moving from star to star on a map of the galaxy, buying and selling quantities of six types of merchandise in a competition to make the most money. The game was developed by Dave Kaufman for computers in 1973, and its BASIC source code was printed in the January 1974 issue of the People's Computer Company Newsletter. It was reprinted in the 1975 book What to Do After You Hit Return. The game was the inspiration for the multiplayer Trade Wars series, beginning in 1984, and is thought to be the antecedent to much of the space trading genre.

== Gameplay ==
Screenshot of gameplay, featuring the galaxy map

Star Trader is a multiplayer space trading game, in which players trade resources between star systems in order to make the most money. The game presents a star map of the galaxy in which each player moves about trading between star systems of different levels of economic development. The players travel from planet to planet buying and selling six types of merchandise: uranium, metals, gems, software, heavy equipment, and medicine. The different levels of planet have different needs and produce different kinds and amounts of goods, which influences their prices. In the course of the game the level of development of planets can improve and new planetary systems can be discovered. Haggling over the price of goods is a central part of gameplay. The game's interface is text-only.

== Development ==
Star Trader was written by Dave Kaufman in the BASIC programming language. The source code to the game was published in the People's Computer Company Newsletter in volume 2, issue 3 in January 1974. The concept for the game is seemingly based on Isaac Asimov's Foundation series of novels.

== Legacy ==
In 1975, the game's code was reprinted in What to Do After You Hit Return. Star Trader was used as the inspiration for the first game of the Trade Wars series of multiplayer space trading games in 1984, making it the ancestor of many subsequent space trader games, including Eve Online, the Wing Commander Privateer series, and Elite series.

Master Trader by Argon Games is a version of the game that appeared in What to Do After You Hit Return, in which 2 to 12 players buy and sell products throughout the universe for profit; Ian Chadwick reviewed Master Trader in Ares Magazine #12 and commented that "Trader is not a bad game, just not terribly exciting. Broderbund's Galactic Trader may be a better game (especially visually) but it is only solitaire play."

Several unrelated but similar space trading games have been released under the name Star Trader. One such game was released by Bug Byte Software in 1984 for the ZX Spectrum and Commodore 64, and was one of the games included with the Softaid compilation.

Screenshot of the Linux/Unix version of the game, featuring the galaxy map

Another version, Star Lanes, was written by Steven Farber and published in Interface Age in June 1977. S. J. Singer republished this in 1984 under the name Star Traders; this version was ported by John Zaitseff for Microsoft Basic under the CP/M-80 operating system in 1988. Completely rewritten versions for CP/M-80, CP/M-86, MS-DOS, Microsoft Windows 3.1 and Linux/Unix followed, with the latest release for Linux and Unix occurring in January 2024. All versions by John Zaitseff have been released or relicensed under the GNU General Public License v3.
