= Trade Wars =

Series of video games

Trade Wars is a series of video games dating back to 1984. The video games are inspired by Hunt the Wumpus, the board game Risk, and the original space trader game Star Trader.

== History ==
The first game with the title, Trade Wars, by Chris Sherrick, was developed in BASIC for the TRS-80 Model II, and soon ported, by Sherrick, to the IBM PC for the Nochange BBS system in 1984. Sherrick conceived his game as a cross between Dave Kaufman's BASIC program Star Trader (1974), the board game Risk, and Gregory Yob's Hunt the Wumpus (1972).

Because Sherrick released his earliest versions with a free license, many variations of the game appeared over the next few years, including TWV - Galactic Armageddon, Yankee Trader, and TW2 (a development of the original by John Morris who took over from Chris Sherrick).

In September 1986, James T. Gunderson, a sysop known by the handle "Lord Darkseid", ported TradeWars to Turbo Pascal 3 for use on WWIV BBSes. Like most games for WWIV at this time, Gunderson's TradeWars implementation was written as a chain or sub-program. This enabled sysops to install the game without recompiling WWIV, but it required Gunderson to distribute the game as source code, rather than as compiled code. He called his version TW2 for WWIV, and it shared no source code with the Sherrick version, which had been written in Basic.

A succession of sysops and users modified Gunderson's version, making bug fixes, adding new features, and incorporating thematic elements from disparate sources like Star Trek and Superman.

WWIV sysop Gary Martin also obtained this the source code, which he later described as a "hot mess" that "crashed all the time." In an effort to stabilize the game, he overhauled the core source code, and released his new version as Trade Wars 2001 in late 1986. Only 14 sysops paid to register TW2001. But Martin's next effort, the TradeWars 2002 series, would become arguably the most popular variant of TradeWars.

In 1988, the author of WWIV, Wayne Bell, ported his BBS software in Turbo C. This major change meant older chain programs would no longer work, so beginning in March 1989, Martin embarked on a total rewrite of TW2001. He added numerous new features, such as the StarDock, where players could interact with each other, buy new ships, and watch "movies" (ANSI art animations). A fan of Star Trek: The Next Generation at this time, Martin decided to give his game a more consistent Star Trek theme, and established the Ferrengi as the game's main antagonists. TradeWars 2002 v1.00 was released in June 1991. No longer just a WWIV chain, TW2002 was a standalone program that could run with almost any BBS software.

TW2002 v1, v2, and v3 were BBS mainstays throughout the 1990s. In 1998, Gary Martin sold the Trade Wars license to John Pritchett, who had written Tradewars 2002 v3 and its gold expansion. John and his company, EIS, developed a stand-alone game server, TradeWars Game Server, which has allowed Trade Wars to survive beyond the BBS era. Martin and Pritchett together have sold more than 28,000 TW2002 registrations between 1990 and 2025.

== Gameplay ==
Though specifics vary between versions, in general the player is a trader in a galaxy with a fixed set of other players (either human or computer). The players seek to gain control of resources: usually fuel ore, food, and equipment, and travel through sectors of the galaxy trading them for money or undervalued resources. Players use their wealth to upgrade their spaceship with better weapons and defenses, and fight for control of planets and star bases.

Since the basics of the game structure are numerical, these games are not reliant on high resolution graphics or rapid processing, which makes them ideally suited to low-resource computing platforms.

Today, classic Trade Wars is primarily hosted by Windows computers running the Trade Wars Game Server (TWGS), which accepts incoming telnet connections and launches the Trade Wars ANSI game. Trade Wars is also run by many of the surviving BBSs, and variations have been ported to the web, cell phones, and the Palm OS.

== Reception ==
Computer Gaming World in 1993 rated Trade Wars two points out of three, stating that for many players "there is no other on-liner than Trade Wars ... This game will be around for a while, in one form or another".

The editors of netgames called TW2002 "perhaps the granddaddy of all BBS games" in 1994, the same year Pritchett has said was the peak of the game's popularity, with an estimated 70,000 active TradeWars players.

== Legacy ==
Trade Wars 2002 was named the 10th best PC game of all time by PC World Magazine in 2009.

Trade Wars is cited as an influence by game developers including Paul Sage, lead designer of Ultima Online, Josh Johnston, lead programmer of Jumpgate, Eric Wang, producer of Earth & Beyond, and Pete Mackay, a designer of Star Citizen.

Reviewers have compared many games to TradeWars, including EVE Online, Jumpgate, and Spore.

A major online game based on Trade Wars 2002 was under development in the early 2000s under the name TW: Dark Millennium, later renamed Exarch. When the developer, Realm Interactive, was acquired by their publisher, NCsoft Austin (Richard Garriott/Destination Games), the development of Exarch was discontinued. What started as TW: DM was eventually released by NCsoft as Dungeon Runners.

== See also ==
- Space combat simulator
