= Trav =

Trav may refer to:

- Harness racing, a form of horse-racing in Scandinavia
- La traviata, an opera by Giuseppe Verdi
- Travian, a massively multiplayer online browser-based strategy game
- Trav (musician), an American rapper and songwriter
