= Travian Games =

German video game developer

Travian Games GmbH
- Type: Limited company
- Industry: Software
- Founded: Munich, Germany (2005)
- Headquarters: Munich, Germany
- Area served: Worldwide
- Key people: Viktor Pulz (CEO)
- Products: Massively multiplayer online games
- Number of employees: 120 (2024)
- Website: www.traviangames.com

Travian Games GmbH, based in Munich, is a medium-sized German company in the software industry that has specialized in developing and marketing PC and browser games. Travian Games is the largest video games company in Bavaria, ranks among the top 10 largest game studios in Germany, and is a member of the GAME Federal Association of the German Games Industry.

== History ==
In 2003, company founder Gerhard Müller and his team developed the first version of the strategy browser game Travian. The free-to-play game was released in the summer of the following year and renamed to Travian: Legends in 2015. The game remains one of the world's most successful browser games to this day. Travian Games GbR was established in Munich at the beginning of 2005. In the fall of the same year, it changed to its current form: Travian Games GmbH. The original staff of four employees, including the founder's brother, Siegfried Müller, and his former school friend, Holger Miller, grew within just a few years to its current size of more than 120 employees. This expansion resulted in Travian Games GmbH becoming the largest employer in the games industry in Bavaria. In 2006, their flagship game Travian already reached a million players.

Due to the increasing number of employees and the focus on new developments, the company relocated to a larger office complex within Munich in 2008 and 2009. In 2010, the company acquired the Hamburg developer studio Northworks which, with the support of the City of Hamburg's prototype sponsorship, had until then been able to launch two browser games on the market, including goalunited. In the following year, Travian Games GmbH was awarded the Prize for the Best German Publisher by GameStar. Moreover, Travian Games acquired the majority stake in the Cologne developer studio Bright Future in 2012. The company had already successfully worked with the studio two years previously to develop the magical garden simulation game Miramagia followed by the MMO browser game Rail Nation in 2013. Bright Future also worked with Electronic Arts on the successful PC game series FIFA Manager.

To mark the 10-year anniversary of the flagship game, Travian, which continues to be offered as Travian: Legends, the new browser game Travian Kingdoms was developed under the direction of company founder Gerhard Müller. The online racing game UnitedGP was also launched on the market in 2014. Since the change in management in 2015, the company has been placing greater focus on developing and marketing PC games with strong multi-player elements, which aim to provide a community-driven gaming experience. The strategic direction of the games developer shifted with the new managing director, Lars Janssen. Travian Games has since concentrated on its core business, developing its own browser games, but it has also expanded its international portfolio. The Bavarian games developer also became a third-party publisher for the massively multi-player online role-playing game (MMORPG) Crowfall (ArtCraft Entertainment) in 2016, and for the massively multiplayer online game (MMOG) Shroud of the Avatar (Portalarium) in 2017.

Over the years, the company discontinued its third-party marketing activities due to a lack of success. In July 2024, with the appointment of the new CEO Viktor Pulz, the strategic direction shifted once again. The company is now focusing specifically on the further development of its successful games (Travian: Legends, Rail Nation, Travian Kingdoms, and goalunited) and is bringing these titles to mobile devices. The most successful title, Travian: Legends, was released as a mobile app for Android and iOS in November 2024.

== Games ==
Travian Games has been expanding across the full breadth of the online gaming entertainment sector for years and is currently represented on the market with its 4 live products: Travian: Legends, Travian Kingdoms, Rail Nation, and goalunited LEGENDS. Products from the Travian Games portfolio are played in more than 200 countries around the globe and translated into up to 42 different languages. In this way, the company is able to reach more than 150 million registered and confirmed users worldwide. The products by Travian Games GmbH have also received multiple awards and are recognized for the long-lasting fun they provide.

=== Current games ===
- Travian: Legends (strategy MMOG)
- Travian Kingdoms (strategy MMOG)
- Rail Nation (transport economy simulator MMOG)
- goalunited LEGENDS (soccer manager MMOG)

=== Discontinued games ===
- Miramagia (Multiplayer farm management)
- Travians (MMORPG)

== Travian Games as a third-party publisher ==
In 2017, Travian Games announced its support for the Texan developer studio Portalarium in the release of the MMOG Shroud of the Avatar for the European market, as well as in South and Central America, the Middle East and North Africa. The online game was created by well-known game designer Richard Garriott. Portalarium confirmed on 28 November 2018 that Shroud of the Avatar is no longer being published by Travian Games.

Travian Games GmbH acts as third-party publisher for the MMORPG Crowfall, which is set to launch in 2019. The game is being developed by ArtCraft Entertainment, based in Texas. The first client-based game in the company's history attracted around US$2.8 million, making it the most successful crowdfunding project in video game history. Over the years, the company discontinued its third-party marketing activities due to a lack of success.

== Charitable commitment ==
Travian Games assumes social responsibility as part of various charitable projects. Since 2010, the company has been supporting GamesCampMunich, a conference for young students and those interested in the video game industry. The company additionally became a sponsor for the Munich Children's Hospice Foundation in 2017. Not only does the company raise donations for the organization, it also engages in voluntary work for the charity. In addition, Travian Games GmbH uses green energy from Bavarian hydro-electric power plants. The supplier, Polarstern, is one of the Ökotest test winners; it supplies the electricity and supports a family in Cambodia in the construction of a micro biogas installation for each of its customers. This kind of installation changes the lives of entire families and promotes sustainability.
