= WWIVnet =

WWIVnet was a bulletin board system (BBS) network for WWIV-based BBSes. It was created by Wayne Bell on December 1, 1987. The system was similar to FidoNet in purpose, but used a very different routing mechanism that was more automated and distributed.

== Network layout ==
WWIVnet consisted of several participating BBSes, each referenced by a unique number called a node number. Originally, WWIVnet nodes were numbered by area code. The format was TXYZZ, where X and Y were the first and last digits of the area code, and ZZ was a number that ranged from 00 to 49 in area codes with a middle digit of 0, or a number between 50 and 99 in area codes with a middle digit of 1. The T portion of the node number was only used if a particular area code ran out of node numbers in their assigned range and needed more, the T would become 1. Thus, node 5802 would be a node in the 508 area code, and node 12263 would be a node in a very busy 212 area code. This numbering system worked well until the telephone systems began using area codes that used numbers other than 1 or 0 as the middle digit. When this occurred, WWIVnet realized it had to change its numbering system so a group based system was adopted, where node numbers would change to an XZZZ system. In this system, X would be the group number, and ZZZ would be the system number under that group.

The network's administration was set up where every area code had an Area Coordinator (AC) which was responsible for maintaining information about the nodes in their area code. The AC reported to the Group Coordinator (GC), which was responsible for updating the node lists for the area codes under them. The GC reported to the Network Coordinator (NC), who was responsible for sending out node list updates. The NC was the person who was ultimately in charge of WWIVnet.

The network structure, however, had everything to do with administration but nothing to do with the way traffic was transmitted. Simply put the only way to control the flow of data was to reduce the number of nodes on the network the system connected to. If two nodes were connected and it was the closest possible route for other nodes the traffic would follow that route. So if a node wanted to stop through traffic then they would connect to a single node for all traffic. There was no other form of traffic control on the network. Connection weight although added to the network data record was never implemented. If a specific route went down, the network would automatically try to reroute the packets in the next fastest route it could calculate. This method was an early version of peer-to-peer file sharing and may be the first instance of this type of file sharing. Note that while FidoNet was created before WWIVnet and transmitted files between systems, it did not use a peer-to-peer system because the traffic was routed using a set hierarchical model and servers (hubs/feeds) controlled all traffic. Wayne Bell referred to the networking method used by WWIVnet as a grid, similar to mesh networking, and often said he based it on Usenet.

== See also ==
- FidoNet
- FsxNet
