= Robert Garriott =

American businessman (born 1956)

Robert K. Garriott (born December 7, 1956) is an American video game industry figure and entrepreneur. He co-founded Origin Systems and Destination Games with his brother, Richard Garriott, and was the CEO of NCsoft-North America from 2001 until 2008. He is the second-eldest son of NASA astronaut Owen Garriott.

Garriott graduated from the MIT Sloan School of Management in 1983 with a Master of Science in Management and also earned degrees in Electrical Engineering from Rice University, and a master's degree in Engineering Economic Systems from Stanford University.

In 1983 he co-founded computer game developer Origin Systems with his younger brother Richard "Lord British" Garriott. He was a vice president and later an executive vice president at Electronic Arts (EA) after the company acquired Origin in 1992. Garriott left EA in 1995 and co-founded Destination Games in 2000. Destination was bought by NCsoft in 2001 and he became president and CEO of NCsoft-North America.
