= Destination Games =

American video game development company

- Formerly: NCSOFT Austin (2001–2009)
- Company type: Subsidiary
- Industry: Video games
- Founded: April 2000; 26 years ago, in Austin, Texas
- Founders: Richard Garriott; Robert Garriott; Starr Long
- Defunct: 2009; 17 years ago
- Fate: Dissolved
- Successor: Portalarium
- Headquarters: 6801 North Capital of Texas Highway, Austin, Texas, United States; 78731
- Products: Tabula Rasa
- Parent: NCSOFT (2001–2009)
- Website: www.destination-games.com (No longer active)

Destination Games was an American computer game development company created in April 2000 by Richard Garriott, Robert Garriott and Starr Long, following their departure from Origin Systems. ("Destination" is a play on "Origin", the company the Garriotts founded nearly two decades earlier.)

Destination was founded in Austin, Texas to develop massively multiplayer online role-playing games. At E3 2001, Richard Garriott announced a partnership making Destination the United States headquarters of South Korean MMORPG giant NCSOFT. As NCSOFT Austin, Destination has mainly focused on developing and supporting the North American version of NCSOFT's Lineage games.

In 2007 Destination Games released its first game, Tabula Rasa, a sci-fi MMORPG. The game did not sell as well as was hoped, Richard Garriott left NCSOFT in 2008, and the game service closed in February 2009. The Destination Games website was taken down when NCsoft moved its United States headquarters from Austin to Seattle—calling it NCSOFT West—in 2008.

NCSOFT Austin employed five people to run the casual MMOG Dungeon Runners, but announced in 2009 that support for this game will be ending in early 2010 due to low subscription numbers. As of October 2009, NCSOFT employs about 150 people in the former Destination Games office in Austin mainly working in server operations, quality assurance, and customer support for various NCSOFT MMO titles, however development operations have moved completely to other NCSSOFT subsidiaries on the West Coast. The trademark Destination Games remains a property of NCSOFT.

== Works ==
Year	Title	Platforms(s)	Notes	Ref.
2007	Tabula Rasa	Microsoft Windows	Discontinued in 2009	
2007	Dungeon Runners	Microsoft Windows	Discontinued in 2010	
