= Telegard =

Bulletin board system

Telegard is an early bulletin board system (BBS) software program for IBM PC-compatible computers running MS-DOS and OS/2. Telegard was written by Eric Oman, Martin Pollard, and Tim Strike in Pascal with routines written in C++ and assembly language, based on a copy of the WWIV source code.

Telegard has several features that make it attractive to BBS sysops, such as being free, having remote administration facilities built into the main program, and the ability to handle CD-ROMs internally. Telegard is still viable today as it can accept telnet connections by using a virtual modem/FOSSIL set up such as NetSerial, a virtual modem driver, and NetFoss, a freeware FOSSIL driver, both for Windows.

== See also ==
- Mystic BBS
- Renegade (BBS)
- WWIV
