= Starr Long =

American game developer

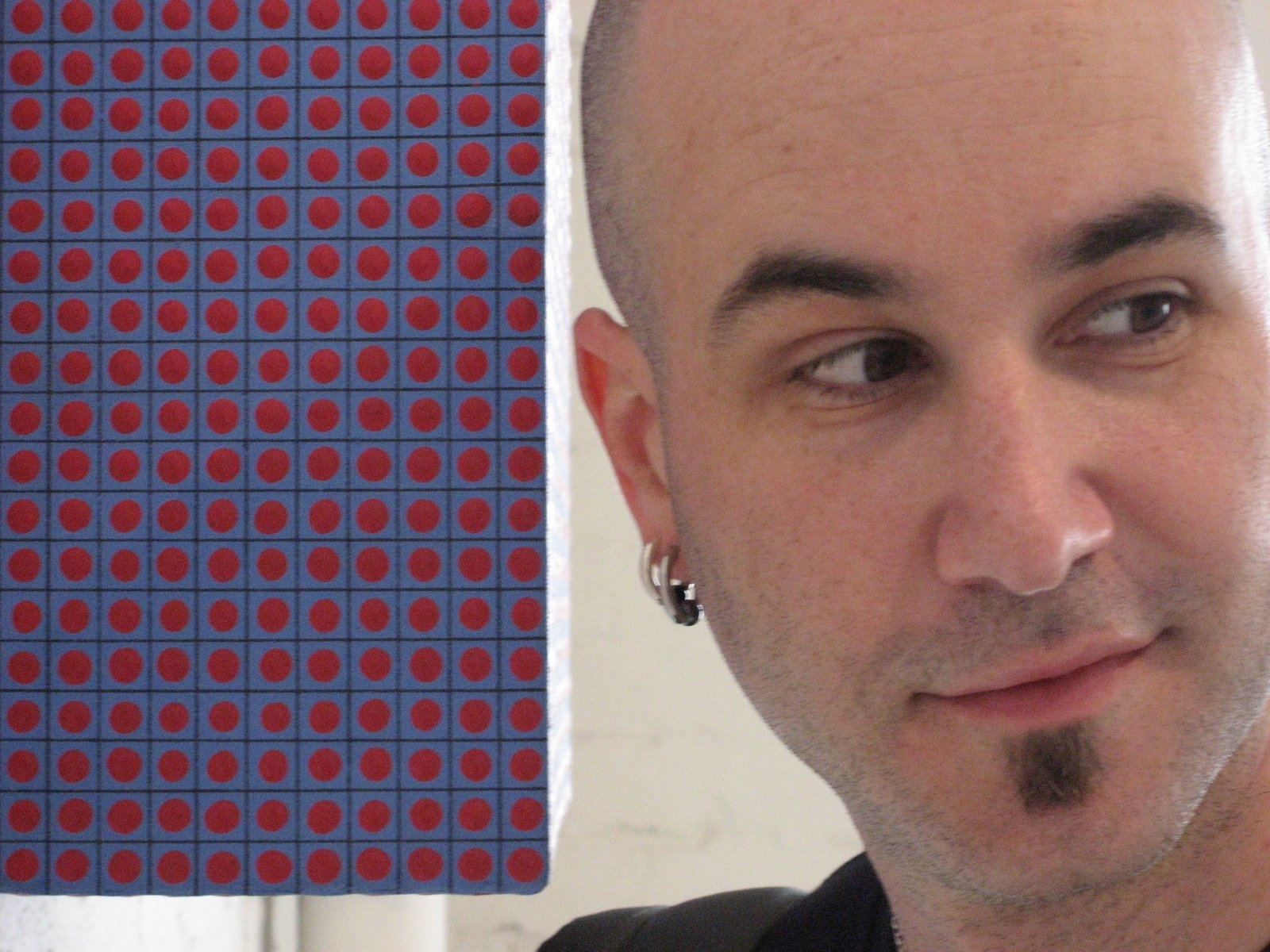
- Long in 2007
- Born: Starr McAuley Long; March 12, 1970 (age 56); Baton Rouge, Louisiana
- Education: Louisiana State University
- Occupation: Game developer
- Known for: Director of Ultima Online
- Spouse: Eugenie
- Children: 1
- Awards: Listed as one of the Top 20 Most Influential People in the MMO industry

Starr McAuley Long (born March 12, 1970) is an American game developer, a long time collaborator with Richard Garriott at the companies Origin Systems (1992–2000), Destination Games (2000–2008), and Portalarium (2013–present). In 1997, Long was the original director of the early graphical multiplayer game Ultima Online, and from 2008–2013 he was executive producer at The Walt Disney Company, where he created and managed several educational games and apps for Club Penguin and the Disney Connected Learning platform. In early 2008, he was listed as one of the Top 20 Most Influential People in the MMO industry. In 2013, he again partnered with Garriott at Portalarium, where they began working on a new game Shroud of the Avatar.

== Career ==
Long grew up in Baton Rouge, Louisiana, the only child of Zelda Klein Long (1948–2013) and Max "Cary" Long (1943–2003), who ran an antique store, Goudeau Antiques. He graduated in 1988 from Baton Rouge Magnet High School, and then attended Louisiana State University, earning a degree in Theatre in 1992. He did some part-time work building sets for local theaters such as Baton Rouge Opera, and then moved with some friends to Austin, Texas, where he continued at venues such as Live Oak Theatre. Because of the low pay in the theater business though, he began looking for other opportunities. On a whim, in September 1992 he responded to an ad looking for paid game testers, and to his surprise found himself suddenly hired by Richard Garriott's well-known game company Origin Systems (which, later that same month, was acquired by Electronic Arts). At Origin, Long worked in Quality Assurance, documenting bugs on games such as Ultima VII, Wing Commander III, and ShadowCaster.

He was soon promoted to QA Lead on games such as BioForge, then in 1995 to associate producer on Ultima IX, and to director of the first online version of the Ultima series, Ultima Online, where Long's online persona was known as Lord Blackthorn. The game was released in 1997, and though not the first graphical MMO, gained considerable attention as part of the popular Ultima series, attracting 250,000 players. It went on to win several awards, including being the first inductee to the GDC Online Awards Hall of Fame, and was listed by TIME magazine as one of the 100 greatest video games of all time.

In 2000, Long and the Garriott brothers left Origin (which was disbanded by its parent company Electronic Arts in 2004), and formed a new company, Destination Games. In 2001 it was acquired by Korea-based NCsoft, with the company's first game Tabula Rasa released in late 2007. However, the game did not perform as well as was hoped, both Garriott and Long left the company in 2008, and the game was shut down in February 2009.

The two then parted ways for a time, with Garriott forming a new company, Portalarium, and Long moving his family to Los Angeles, where he was hired by The Walt Disney Company as an executive producer. During the next four years, Long oversaw the creation of several social games and mobile apps for Disney and its subdivision Disney Interactive, such as the Disney Connected Learning Platform, the Disney Parent App for Facebook, several educational mini-games and a mobile version for Club Penguin, and several educational games for iPhones and iPads. Educators collaborating on the projects included Stanford University's Roy Pea and professors from the University of Georgia such as John Olive and Linda Labbo. Some games created were original concepts such as Pufflescape, Jelly Bean Counter, and Bits & Bolts, while others leveraged existing Disney properties, such as Cinderella Shapes & Patterns, Toy Story Letters & Letter Sounds, Fairies Art Studio, Ariel Numbers and Counting, Cars Numbers and Counting, and Disney Fairies Fashion Boutique. For a time, Long also managed the Disney online worlds Toontown Online, Pirates of the Caribbean Online, and Pixie Hollow, which were all closed in late 2013.

In 2013 Long left Disney, formed his own consulting company "Stellar Effect", and then re-joined Richard Garriott at Portalarium. As of 2014, they are collaborating on a new game, Shroud of the Avatar, intended to be a crowd-funded and crowd-sourced title. Via Kickstarter in April 2013, Portalarium raised $2 million through crowdfunding, and Long was announced as executive producer in July 2013. The game was released in March 2018.

In 2018 Long started working at The Acceleration Agency where he has worked on several projects including the Princess Cruises Medallion, OPTICS Active Digital Twin, INVI Mental Health, Secret Cinema Gates of Gozer, and more. In 2025 Long's OPTICS Digital Twin project for the Port of Corpus Christi won an Esri innovation award.

== Recognition ==
- 2007, listed at #12 as one of the Top 20 Most Influential People in MMOs by Beckett Massive Online Gamer magazine
- 2010, Ultima Online is the first inductee to the GDC Online Awards Hall of Fame
