= Portalarium =

Defunct American video game developer

Portalarium, Inc.
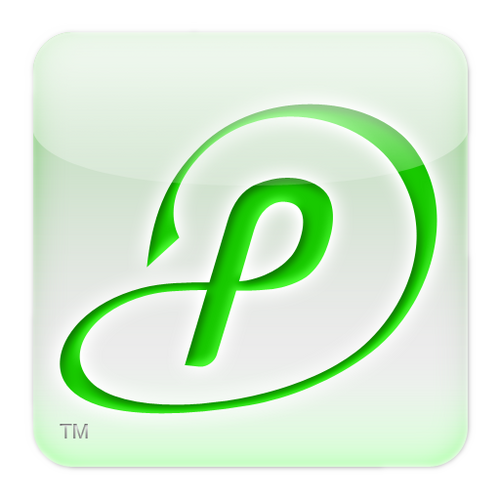
- Type: Private
- Industry: Video games Social networking
- Predecessor: Origin Systems; Destination Games
- Founded: 2009
- Defunct: 2019/2020
- Fate: Defunct
- Headquarters: Austin, TX, United States
- Key people: Richard Garriott, Starr Long
- Products: Shroud of the Avatar
- Website: www.portalarium.com

Portalarium, Inc. was a video game developer based in Austin, Texas, that was formed in September 2009 by Richard Garriott and his longtime game-industry partners, Dallas Snell and Fred Schmidt. Portalarium marked Garriott's return to the video game industry after the release of his 2007 title Tabula Rasa. The name "Portalarium," as well as the company's motto, "We take you there," are intended as a continuity and reference to Garriott's prior two companies' names and respective mottoes: Origin Systems ("We Create Worlds") and Destination Games ("We have arrived").

The company released Port Casino, thenUltimate Collector: Garage Sale in a partnership with Zynga but shut them down when the Facebook game market crashed.

Their next title, Shroud of the Avatar: Forsaken Virtues, is an MMORPG and spiritual successor to the Ultima series. Garriott has stated that if had he been able to secure the rights to the Ultima intellectual property from Electronic Arts, that the game could in fact literally have become Ultima Online 2 in name. Starr Long, who originally served as project director for Ultima Online at Origin, and represented the character of Lord Blackthorn in game, joined the Portalarium team to work as executive producer for Shroud of the Avatar.

In October 2019, the assets and rights to Shroud of the Avatar were sold to Catnip Games, a company owned by Portalarium CEO Chris Spears. Portalarium itself has been dormant since then, with no games in development or known assets. The company later had its right to transact business forfeited by the Texas Comptroller. As of September 2020, Portalarium appears to be defunct.
