= Galactic Trader (1980 video game) =

- Apple II cover
- Developer: Cybernautics
- Release: 1980

Galactic Trader is a 1980 video game published by Cybernautics.

== Contents ==
Galactic Trader is a game in which the player was a general during the war, but now only commands a small ship that trades goods across the galaxy.

== Reception ==
Glenn Mai reviewed Galactic Trader in The Space Gamer No. 38. Mai commented that "Overall, a good game despite its flaws. Although the [...] price tag might be a bit high, I must recommend this game for anyone who likes playing games against the computer."
