= TAG (bulletin board system) =

T.A.G. is am MS-DOS-based bulletin board system released from 1986 to 2000. It was developed by Victor Capton, Randy Goebel, Alan Jurison, Paul Loeber, Robert Numerick, and Paul Williams.

== History ==
T.A.G. was written in Borland Pascal and is free for business or personal use. The authors considered it fun to give the program away while others tried to charge for BBS programs. The software was a fork from an early version of the WWIV source code.

A quote from one of the authors:

We all poured countless hours into the development and support of people running BBSs. Even today I don't think the internet has come close to the sense of community and simple accomplishment that BBSing provided. Building and running a complete environment on your local computer and watching people use it is a far different experience than putting up a web page on some remote server. We all made and still have a great many friends from being sysops and BBS developers.

Other Notes:

No one ever got them to answer definitively on what their name stood for, but there was a reasonably reliable rumor that it was from "The Adventurer's Guild" which was a Dungeons and Dragons sort of reference.

=== ASCII Intro Screen ===
The intro screen to the T.A.G. BBS login was:

   /\/\/\/\/\/\/\/\/\/\/\/\/\/\/\/\/\/\/\/\/\/\/\/\/\/\/\/\/\/\/\/\/\/\/\/\/\
  /\/\/\/                     [>> Welcome to <<]                       \/\/\/\
 |   /\/      ______________        ______          ___________         \/\   |
 |  / /      /             /|      /     /|        /          /\         \ \  |
 | / /       TTTTTTTTTTTTTT/       AAAAAA /|       GGGGGGGGGGG\/|         \ \ |
 |/\/ /\           TT |           AA|___AA /|      GG |      GG/        /\ \/\|
 |-< <  >          TT |          AA/     AA /|     GG |   _____        <  > >-|
 |\/\ \/           TT |         AAAAAAAAAAAA |     GG |  /     /|       \/ /\/|
 | \ \             TT |         AA |      AA |     GG |__GGGGGG |         / / |
 |  \ \            TT |         AA |      AA |     GG/       GG |        / /  |
 |   \/\           TT/   <>     AA/       AA/  <>   GGGGGGGGGGG/  <>    /\/   |
  \/\/\/\                                                              /\/\/\/
   \/\/\/\/\/\/\/\/\/\/\/\/\/\/\/\/\/\/\/\/\/\/\/\/\/\/\/\/\/\/\/\/\/\/\/\/\/
