= Tabula Rasa (video game) =

2007 video game

Richard Garriott's Tabula Rasa
- Developer: Destination Games
- Publisher: NCsoft
- Producer: Starr Long
- Designers: Richard Garriott; Paul D. Sage
- Programmer: Matthew Walker
- Composers: Chris Vrenna; Clint Walsh
- Platform: Microsoft Windows
- Release: November 2, 2007
- Genre: MMORPG
- Mode: Multiplayer

Richard Garriott's Tabula Rasa is a discontinued massively multiplayer online game developed by Destination Games and published by NCsoft, designed in part by Richard Garriott. The game is a role-playing video game that blends certain shooter aspects into the combat system. It was officially released to retail on November 2, 2007, with customers that pre-ordered the game allowed access to the live servers from October 30, 2007. The development team released updates, called "Deployments," nearly every month following launch. The game required a monthly subscription.

Tabula Rasa is about humanity's last stand against a group of aliens called the Bane. The story takes place in the near future on two planets, Arieki and Foreas, which were in a state of constant conflict between the AFS (Allied Free Sentients) and the Bane. The term tabula rasa means "clean slate" in Latin, which refers to a fresh start, or starting over.

According to the developers, the game included the ability for players to influence the outcome of a war between the player characters and the NPCs. Tabula Rasa became free to play on January 10, 2009, and closed on February 28, 2009.

== Background ==
According to the fictional background story in Tabula Rasa, there once was an advanced alien species known as the Eloh. They freely shared their knowledge of how to convert between matter and energy with just the mind, called Logos, to other less advanced races. One of these less advanced races, the Thrax, used this power to wage war against the Eloh, a war which the Eloh won but at a great cost. This led to a great divide in the Eloh. One faction wanted to keep on spreading the knowledge as they had before. The other, called the Neph, sought to control the development of "lesser races" to ensure they, the Neph, would always be the superior species. This inner conflict led the Neph faction to leave the Eloh and seek other allies, among them the defeated Thrax; this species along with others joined to form the Bane, which is controlled by the Neph.

As one of their first acts, they attacked the Eloh world; the surviving Eloh fled and were scattered among the worlds they had previously visited. The Bane attacked Earth sometime in our near future. Humanity was hopelessly outmatched and the majority was completely wiped out. Luckily, the Eloh had left behind some of their technology that had the ability to make wormholes to other worlds. There, humans found other species doing the same thing they had, fighting against the Bane to survive. They banded together to form the Army of the Allied Free Sentients to fight against the Bane.

According to information from the game's manual, it has been roughly five years since Earth was attacked. It was eventually discovered that Earth had not been destroyed as once thought, but had instead become a massive staging ground for the Bane. From there they strengthened their forces and increased attacks upon the AFS.

== Gameplay ==
=== Combat ===
The combat mixed in some aspects from shooters to add some real-time action elements to the game. It still was not an outright shooter and featured sticky targeting and dice rolling based on character stats underneath. Stickiness could be adjusted to fit the preference of the player. Some weapons like the shotgun did not use the sticky targeting. In addition to a hit-miss system, Tabula Rasa adjusted the damage based on the situation. Real-time factors like weapon type, ammo type, stance, cover, and movement were taken into account. The enemies were reported to have AI that would try to take advantage of the terrain, their numbers, and would try to flank the players. The mix of system based combat and real-time movement and physics systems created a gameplay meant to encourage the player to think tactically}; e.g. to take cover behind a pillar to get some time to reload the weapon while the enemies were getting into position again.

=== Missions and storytelling ===
Missions will be given out by NPCs but will not be static. What missions are available and even the access to the NPCs themselves are subject to how the battlefield is going. Some may be specific to control points that the player will need to reclaim from the Bane to gain access again. Missions are also to have multiple options to take. One example is destroying a dam to stop Bane forces that will also demolish a local village. A player can choose to just destroy or try to warn the village beforehand risking further advances by the Bane. Referred to as "ethical parables" they are to make up about 20% of all missions. The missions the player chooses to do and the choices made during them will change the way certain NPCs treat the player's character. Some missions will deliver the player's character to private instanced spaces. One design goal of the game is to use instanced spaces to create in-depth storytelling, with puzzles, traps, and NPCs, that would be more difficult in shared spaces. Some missions will be ethically challenging. The players will have to choose from different points of view and it can alter their future progress. "Ethical and moral dilemmas are something we definitely wanted to incorporate into the design of Tabula Rasa from the very start. The entire goal is to give you pause and allow you to think about the choices that they make in order to accomplish a mission."

=== Logos ===
Logos is a pictographic language left behind by the Eloh to be understood by other races. As players go through the game, they will gain Logos symbols to add to their Logos tablet, a blank slate, and begin to learn the language found throughout the game and gain special powers. Logos can be considered the equivalent of magic for Tabula Rasa, inasmuch as magic allows for incredible, otherwise unexplained acts; however, the logos are shown to be an extension of a scientific process developed by the Eloh. Players can improve these abilities and the upgraded versions can add new tactical uses. Some are universal while others are class specific. Some examples range from lightning bolt attacks, sprinting, reinforcements, and poison type powers. These are very hard to find, being hidden throughout Tabula Rasa.

=== Character creation ===
Tabula Rasa had a tree character class system. Everyone started out as first "tier" (branch) Recruit and as they progress they were able to branch out. The second "tier" included the Soldier and Specialist, which in turn had two subclasses of their own each. There were a total of 4 tiers.

Tabula Rasa also had a cloning function at each tier. It worked like a save function for characters at the branching point and allowed the player to try out the other branch without having to repeat the first several levels.

Introduced in patch 1.4.6 were the hybrid characters. These were humans who have had their DNA blended with either Thrax, Forean or Brann DNA to produce different stats and bonuses to the character. Only full humans were available at the beginning, with the hybrid DNA becoming available via quest chains during play which in turn unlocked the ability to create hybrids on that server at the creation screen, or via cloning.

=== Dynamic battlefield ===
AFS and Bane forces are in constant battle with NPC forces warring over control points and bases. Which side controls these areas greatly impacts the players. Losing one of these to the Bane means that the respawn hospital, waypoints, shops, NPCs access, and base defenses are lost and turned to the Bane's advantage. Players were able to help NPC assaults to take over bases or defend ones under attack. Control of these points was meant to change back and forth commonly even without player involvement, although the current implementation rarely let the Bane muster enough forces to invade a control point during peak player times. The Control Point System was one of the main gameplay features. Players that are fighting to defend or capture a CP (control point) got Prestige points which they could trade in for item-upgrades, experience boosters, a reset of either their attributes or their learned abilities or the purchase of superior or rare equipment at grey market vendors. Prestige could also be earned by defeating bosses, looting rare items, getting the max XP multiplier and by completing special missions. Later in the game, Control points became more and more important to the players, as they were necessary to be either in Bane or AFS hands to accept or complete certain missions and they become the centerpoint of most of the later maps.

=== Wargames (PvP) ===
PvP (Player versus player) in Tabula Rasa was voluntary. As it stands, there were two main modes of PvP combat.

- Wargame duels, commonly known as duels. These were initiated by challenging a player by targeting and using the radial menu. The challenged player must then consent. The wargame is over when one player dies, or when the two players are too far from each other, or one leaves the zone. These impromptu duels could be held between two players, two squads (groups), or a player against a squad.
- Wargame feuds, commonly known as clan wars. These could only be fought by clans who have chosen to be a PvP clan (done during clan creation). Only a clan's leader could initiate or cancel a clan feud, and the request must be accepted by the challenged clan's leader. A clan war lasts 7 real-time days, during which players can fight each other without requesting consent first. During the war, kills are tallied and displayed in the players' wargame trackers. The clan with the most kills at the end of the war wins the feud. Kills are only counted if the players are within 5 levels of each other, though players of any level can fight each other.
- Wargame maps, Edmund Range was the only implemented map that featured large scale team PvP. Using two sets of local teleporters, players could choose between the blue team or the red team. The map could be accessed via the cellar area and was only accessible to players level 45 and above. The map consisted of several Control Points which each team had to capture. At the beginning of each match there were Epic Bane inside of the Control Points to prevent rushers capturing them all, giving a team an unfair advantage at the beginning. In later patches, "Personal Armour Units" were introduced which allowed players to fight in giant robots exclusively in Edmund Range. At the end of each match the losing team were teleported back to the main entrance and the winning team were teleported to the upper floor of the staging area. On the upper floor were unique armour sets vendors that were available to buy using prestige. Portable way points were disabled in the staging area to prevent players from cheating to the upper floor.

== History ==
=== Development ===
In the works since May 2001, the game underwent a major revamp two years into the project. Conflicts between developers and the vague direction of the game were said to be the causes of this dramatic change. Twenty percent of the original team was replaced, and 75% of the code had to be redone. Some staff working on other NCsoft projects were transferred to the Tabula Rasa development team, including City of Heroes' Community Coordinator April "CuppaJo" Burba. First re-shown at E3 2005, the game then transformed into the current science fiction setting and look. The game's budget was $25 million. Nearly 150 people worked on the game.

=== Beta test ===
NCsoft began offering invitations to sign up for a limited beta test of Tabula Rasa on January 5, 2007 which began running on May 2, 2007. Invitations were initially given out only as contest prizes, but beginning on August 8 several thousand additional invitations were distributed via the websites FilePlanet and Eurogamer. The non-disclosure agreement for the beta test was lifted on September 5, 2007 and the test ended on October 26, 2007 with a themed event in which players were invited to attempt to kill the character General British, played by game creator Richard Garriott.

=== Bonus items ===
Two pre-order bonus packs were available on NCsoft's PlayNC website, one for Europe and one for the United States. The European pack is sold for EUR4.99, the US pack for USD4.99 in addition to buying the full retail version of the game for $49.99. Other than currency and which pack goes with which retail version (the European preorder will only be valid with the European release of the game, similarly for the US version), the packs are functionally identical, containing:

- A serial code for unlocking bonus in-game content and beta access (once pre-order customers are able to enter into the beta)
- Exclusive Shell Bot or Pine-Ock non-combat pets, one per character
- Two exclusive character emotes
- Three day head-start on the live servers

For the retail release, a standard version and a collector's edition were released. Both contain the client and an account key with 30 days of included playtime, however the Collector's edition shipped with a number of bonus items including:

- A full colour game manual containing concept art
- A letter briefing from General British
- A map pack displaying the various game regions
- An AFS Challenge Coin and set of Tabula Rasa Dog Tags
- Fold out "Black Ops" poster
- "Making of" Tabula Rasa DVD
- 3 exclusive in-game items granted by the Collector's edition key only: The Boo Bot, a summonable non-combat pet; a set of 4 unique amour paints; and a unique character emote.

=== Release ===
Tabula Rasa was officially released to retail on November 2, 2007, with customers that pre-ordered the game allowed access to the live servers from October 30, 2007. The development team released updates, called "Deployments," nearly every month following launch.

=== Closing ===
On Nov 11th 2008, an open letter to the players of Tabula Rasa stated that Richard Garriott had left NCsoft to pursue other ventures. The announcement that he was leaving NCAustin and Tabula Rasa was done in an open letter to the community, though he later claimed this letter was in fact written by NCsoft as a means of forcing him out. The announcement was made while Garriott was in quarantine after returning from his spaceflight in October, and the announcement claimed he was inspired by the space travel experience to pursue other interests.

On 21 November 2008, weeks after Richard's announcement, Tabula Rasa's development team also released an open letter indicating that the game would end public service on 28 February 2009, citing a lower than expected in-game population as the major factor for the decision. Developers also announced that any active paying player as of 10:00 AM Pacific Time on November 21, 2008 will be eligible for some rewards, including paid time on other NCsoft titles (any paying subscribers joining after that point are ineligible). On Dec 9th 2008, a letter was sent by NCsoft stating that all Tabula Rasa servers would be shut down on February 28, 2009, and that Tabula Rasa would be discontinued. The servers became free to play on January 10, 2009. On February 27, 2009, a message posted on the official website requested that players participate in a final assault, culminating with mutual destruction of AFS and Bane forces.

=== Litigation ===
Richard Garriott sued NCsoft for $24 million for damages relative to his termination from the parent company NCsoft. Garriott's allegation states that NC Soft terminated his employment, then fraudulently reported his termination as willful resignation in order to preserve the right to terminate Garriott's stock options unless he exercised them himself within 90 days of termination, forcing Garriott into a decision to purchase stock with which a loss was incurred worth dozens of millions in profit for Garriott. Additionally, the news of the termination was issued while Garriott was confined to quarantine from the space flight, which was originally intended to be a publicity move to further promote the game and increase revenue. In July 2010, an Austin District Court awarded Garriott US$28 million in his lawsuit against NCsoft, finding that the company did not appropriately handle his departure in 2008. NCsoft stated that it intended to appeal the decision. In October 2011, the United States Court of Appeals for the Fifth Circuit affirmed the judgment.

== Reception ==
Reception

Review scores
Publication	Score
1Up.com	C+
Eurogamer	8/10
GameRevolution	C+
GameSpot	7.5/10
GameSpy	4/5
IGN	7.5/10

Publications started to release reviews mainly after 15 November 2007, 2 weeks after the game's launch, although over a dozen wrote previews based on betas and the 3-day head start for those who pre-ordered.

GameSpy gave the game 4 stars out of 5, outlining that the game's innovative combat system succeeded in redefining MMO combat, and regarded it as one of the most appealing features. Negatives were the obscure and often counterproductive crafting system, a lack of a central trading hub at the initial release and bugs involving general gameplay and reports of memory leaks.

Eurogamer gave the game 8 out of 10, praising the daring-to-be-different approach to combat and to the class/cloning system, allowing players the opportunity for experimenting easily with which career path they choose. On the negative side, the crafting system and lack of an auction house were singled out. Though technical problems were also mentioned, the review notes that a recent patch corrected many of the problems they experienced with the game in that regards.

During the 11th Annual Interactive Achievement Awards, Tabula Rasa received a nomination for "Massively Multiplayer Game of the Year" by the Academy of Interactive Arts & Sciences.
