= Dungeon Runners =

2007 video game

- Developer: NCSOFT
- Publisher: NCSOFT
- Designers: Stephen Nichols, Mark Tucker
- Platform: Windows
- Release: May 29, 2007
- Genre: Massively multiplayer online role-playing
- Mode: Multiplayer

Dungeon Runners was a medieval fantasy, often satirical MMORPG developed and published by NCSOFT. It featured gameplay similar to the Diablo series of games.

== Development ==
Development on the title first began in 2001 as Trade Wars: Dark Millennium. The game was based on the early computer game series of the same name and originally featured a science-fiction setting. It later became Exarch in 2002 and was scrapped for some time until it resurfaced in 2005 with its third and current development team as Dungeon Runners.

Dungeon Runners entered the closed Beta phase in May 2006, and a game trailer was exhibited at the 2006 E3 convention. Open Beta began in December 2006, and Beta accounts could be acquired via an invitation from an existing player or through the NCsoft website. On May 24, 2007, the game officially went live.

Much of the original art was conceived by comic-book artist Joe "Mad" Madureira.

On August 13, 2008, the parent company, NCSoft in Korea, decided to cut 21 members of its staff in Austin, TX due to the company's overall decreasing profits. Out of the 18 member team which developed Dungeon Runners, only three of the original developers remained.

== Features ==
Free gameplay was unlimited (no playfield or activity is closed to free players), but an optional USD $4.99 monthly membership fee granted access to additional features that greatly enhance gameplay. Additionally, users could purchase the game for $19.99. The boxed game came with 6 months of membership as well as a "Bling Gnome". Although described as an MMORPG, the game world was almost entirely uniquely instanced for each party of players.

Dungeon Runners implemented a classless system (see Classes, below) and offered regular updates through patches. One of the most acclaimed patches was the update coined "The Heave" that introduced the first player summon "Chill Bill", and a new high level dungeon. This update patch was very well received by the gaming community and was considered by many to be one of the game's best updates.

== Classes ==
The Beta version of the game featured three playable classes: mage, warrior, and ranger. Each class had different abilities and a different NPC trainer in each neutral playfield. As with similar games, each class had a specific role to play within a party grouping. The warrior was the melee specialist, a "meat shield" to gain and hold aggro. The ranger was a ranged combat specialist, with spell-like skills that allowed different types of damage and damage over time (DoT) attacks. The mage was a ranged area of effect (AoE) combatant, dealing heavy damage to many opponents at once but unable to survive long in close combat.

With the public release of the game, a classless system had been implemented. Like before, the player chose a class (fighter, mage, ranger) when generating the character, determining which package of beginning skills, which weapon and what type of clothing or armor the character began the game with.

After the first dungeon (Dew Valley Forest), the character arrived in the main town where there were three skill trainers, one each devoted to fighter skills, ranger skills, and mage skills. Any character could learn any skills desired from any of the three trainers. In place of a class, each character had a four word descriptive title that changed depending on how the character's attributes were improved (relative to one another) and which skills the player chose. When the player bought new skills from a trainer, each skill had an icon that was placed in the Skill Bar, an interface element at the bottom center of the screen. The Skill Bar had eight slots mapped to number row keys plus two additional slots mapped to each of the mouse buttons. The character could learn all the skills available in the game if the player wished; however, only ten could be accessed at any given time, being limited by the number of slots in the Bar.

If the player wished a radical change in the character's abilities, a "Re-Spec" button was available on the Character Sheet. This allowed the player to completely redistribute the character's attribute points at any time by spending some of the character's gold. The charge for a Re-Spec was based on the character's level and was inexpensive up to level 20, after which the price increased much more quickly per level. The final level cap was 100.

== Graphics and Gameplay ==
The gameplay and graphics styling of Dungeon Runners had been compared to Diablo and Diablo II, especially noting the instanced dungeons (whose level layouts and content were randomly regenerated each time a player logged into the game), the "action RPG" gameplay style, the naming conventions for in-game items, the variable class structure based on three archetypes (five in Diablo II), and the absence of a "healer" class, among other similarities. One notable difference is that Dungeon Runners was rendered using polygonal models, rather than the sprite-based isometric graphics of the Diablo series.

GameSpot and Eurogamer, stated that the graphical quality, third-person point of view and screen layout more closely resembled that of World of Warcraft, another MMORPG.

As of the latest 147 patch, a substantial graphics update was also added.

== PvP ==
NCsoft had introduced a PvP world where players could travel to the town of Pwnston and engage in single duels or group duels with other players. Each character started off with a PvP ranking of 1500 and this number changed according to duel outcomes.

Players could engage in single or group pvp combat and each side could have up to 5 players. The difficulty of the match was also scaled according to the ratio of the group sizes. For instance, a single player facing off against a team of two players would be at 100% power while the other team's two players would be toned down in damage and armor. Depending on your performance you might receive King's coins which could be spent on items.

== Sound ==
Dungeon Runners' in-game music was composed by Tracy W. Bush as straight forward game music in the vein of Diablo II, whereas the boss monsters had their own theme songs, varying in such styles as black metal, synthpop, klezmer and funk.

== End-of-Life Announcement and Shutdown ==
NCsoft said it would be refocusing its efforts on big-budget, top-tier MMOGs. The announcement was accompanied by news that NCsoft had laid off a number of developers working on its casual MMOG Dungeon Runners, as well as cancelled plans to bring the game to other platforms. Dungeon Runners had dropped, as producer and lead programmer Stephen Nichols confirmed that the game will be taken offline on December 31. Dungeon Runners, which operated under both a free-to-play, microtransaction-supported and subscription-based business model, launched to good reviews for the PC in July 2008.

"Dungeon Runners just isn't cutting the mustard", Nichols said on an announcement on the Dungeon Runners forum. "If she were a ship, she'd be taking on water. Yeah, she's been taking on water for a long time now. Are my cryptic references too hard to decipher? The game just isn't profitable. And, the first rule of business is to be profitable!"

Nichols went on to note that, while the team had a number of ideas to generate revenue, they would be expensive and risky to implement. He also noted that said plans would be greatly hampered given that two of the five developers on the game had recently departed from the team.

Nichols noted that those with paid memberships to Dungeon Runners would receive digital copies of City of Heroes' Architect Edition and Guild Wars: Prophecies. The producer also stated that anyone who needed refunds for multiple-month membership purchases would be "taken care of".

The online service for Dungeon Runners ended on January 1, 2010. The website was shut down shortly thereafter on January 3, 2010.
