= Shroud of the Avatar: Forsaken Virtues =

2018 video game

- Developers: Portalarium; Catnip Games (2019–present)
- Publishers: Portalarium; Catnip Games (2019–present)
- Director: Richard Garriott
- Producers: Chris Spears; Stephen Reinen
- Designers: Keith Quinn; Brandon Cotton; Stephen Reinen
- Programmers: David Boulianne; Chris Spears
- Artist: Scott Jones
- Writer: Tracy Hickman
- Engine: Unity 6.6
- Platforms: Windows, macOS, Linux
- Release: March 27, 2018
- Genre: Role-playing
- Modes: Single-player, multiplayer

Shroud of the Avatar: Forsaken Virtues is a 2018 fantasy role-playing video game. Described as being a spiritual successor to the Ultima series, Shroud of the Avatar was developed by Austin, Texas-based developer Portalarium, with a team led by Richard Garriott as creative director, Starr Long as executive producer, Chris Spears as lead technical designer, and Tracy Hickman as lead story designer. It is currently maintained by Catnip Games.

== Gameplay ==
Shroud of the Avatar: Forsaken Virtues features a dual-scale overview world map, player housing, crafting, an active virtue system, and "selective multiplayer", which allows players to choose whether to play online or offline. The entire game can be played offline. Additional funding allowed for stretch goals to be met, such as pets, seasonal weather, interactive music instruments, new locations, and guild-based combat.

Besides offline single player, Shroud of the Avatar shipped with three network play styles: Single Player Online, Friend Party Online, and Open Play Online, however Friend Party Online mode was discontinued. This allows players to choose their desired level of online interaction. Offline play is DRM-free. Players may play from any computer if they elect the online mode of play. Offline single player modes, however, do not have this feature. Additionally, offline characters are not allowed to switch to the online mode of play. Players have the ability to purchase persistent housing, but availability is limited and diminishes as the size of the settlement increases. Homes also have upkeep costs in the form of in-game gold tax which is also payable with the premium currency (Crowns of the Obsidians). However, Kickstarter-purchased homes do not have a maintenance requirement of this type. Additionally, each house has the potential to host player managed vendors that can sell goods for players. In-game player titles based on achievements will be available, as well as special titles for high-level backers.

Characters within Shroud of the Avatar do not have specific classes; players will be able to try out various skills and decide which ones they wish to pursue. Characters have a limited ability to change their skills. In combat, a card based system is used whereby skills are randomly presented, and the number of skills that a character learns will decrease the chance that a specific skill will be presented, however this system is optional and a traditional combat bar may be used. Shroud of the Avatar presents several crafting trades divided into two major components: recipes and processes. Crafting skills are split between gathering and refining, and there are five crafting categories: mining, hunting, foraging, forestry, and cooking. Players gather resources, which are then converted into items. Items are then usable and characters are able to fully interact with them, such as sitting in chairs that the character creates, placing down rugs created from spinning cotton and refining cloth or decorating the player home with lamps constructed from metalwork.

Communication with NPCs is handled through typed responses interpreted by the game or through clickable keywords and quests are mentioned in conversations. There is a rudimentary quest log; however players are encouraged to explore storylines that interest them. Players also have a journal that catalogues major events, but quest objectives will not be separately noted. Quests are designed to encourage exploration, and the game does not handhold players to quest locations. Puzzles feature a fully interactive environment, such as hinges on a door that might need to be removed. Moral choices made in the game will affect how the character is perceived by others. While rejecting extremes in implementation, Garriott identified story-based opportunities opening up Player versus player (PvP) combat; for example, characters would become a free-for-all target once a specific quest is accepted.

== Development ==
Shroud of the Avatar: Forsaken Virtues was publicly announced on March 8, 2013, by Austin, Texas-based developer Portalarium. It was to be the first of five anticipated episodes, each of which would have expanded on the story and introduced new content. Developmental commentary has centered on player choice and discovery as major aspects of game-play and have been presented as alternatives to expected level grinding and item acquisition in existing RPGs. The world is inspired by the Ultima series, J. R. R. Tolkien, and elements of steampunk; Tracy Hickman was heavily involved in writing the story. Following fundraising on Kickstarter, US$1.9 million was raised. As of January 20, 2014, an additional US$1.1 million had been raised.

Art assets were partially crowdsourced. In addition, the Dungeon Kit is available to developers who pledged US$400 or more; this allows royalty-free reuse of the game's assets. On November 24, 2014, an early access version of the game was released on Steam. The game was fully released in March 2018.

In October 2018, the game went free to play. Those who had been playing the game for free no longer had the restrictions imposed on them before, and could play the game as paid players could before.

In October 2019, the assets of the game were sold to Catnip Games, a company owned by Portalarium CEO Chris Spears. Development has also transferred from Portalarium to Catnip Games.

In February 2020, an announcement was made about a new over world map continent named Mistrendur and was being added to the game. This continent would have future Episode 2 content added to it. Also added was a feature that allows players to write custom and complex player NPC dialogue using the Ink scripting language created by Inkle Studios.

In November 2020, a Mounting System was added that allows players to ride various mounted creatures in the game.

In August 2026, Catnip Games CEO Chris Spears announced a massive technical overhaul aimed at drastically improving the game's performance and modernizing its infrastructure. The client was migrated from Unity 2018 to Unity 6.5, while the server was completely rebuilt from the ground up on Linux with a custom networking layer. The update included over 2,000 new features and adjustments, most notably adding unique voice acting for all NPCs, completely refactored AI logic, and full localization for seven new languages. The new server, dubbed the "Chaos Shard," was scheduled for launch on October 1, 2026, to be followed by a full official relaunch and reacquisition campaign for the game.

== Reception ==
Reception

Aggregate score
Aggregator	Score
Metacritic	58/100

While the game was envisioned as a single-player and multiplayer hybrid, it has generally been described as an MMO in gaming publications. With its conversion to a F2P model and introduction of an in-game cash shop seemingly confirming this, critical reception is that the single-player component seems unfinished, unfocused and quite possibly abandoned. Jeremy Peel from PCGamesN states that "Garriott seems undecided about which legacy he is following up – the simulation and single-player storytelling of Ultima VII, or the persistent online world of Ultima Online." and "Shroud of the Avatar's MMO trappings often seem to conflict with its grand storytelling ambitions".

Rissa Trent of MMOGames.com felt the same way and added the game's steep learning curve might be difficult to those who are not familiar with classic MMORPG. She gave it a 6/10 score. The game received "mixed or average reviews", according to review aggregator Metacritic.

The game's reception was initially lukewarm; however according to Dominic Tarason at Rock Paper Shotgun, a host of improvements have been made on the multiplayer side since release. These include a more focused player tutorial area with enhanced new player starting areas, a Looking For Group system, removal of experience penalties on player character death, a global banking system and global chat, and doubled experience gain. In addition to this, a new player-made dungeon system has also been implemented.

== See also ==
- Avatar (Ultima)
