= Wayne Bell =

American computer programmer

Wayne Bell (left) and Kaz Vorpal, at the 1996 WWIVCon

Wayne Bell is the creator of the WWIV BBS system. The first WWIV BBS went online in Los Angeles in December 1984. His BBS, WWIV version 1.0 written in BASIC and 2.0 written in Turbo Pascal later came to be named Amber, node 1 of the WWIVnet BBS network. His handle as the SysOp was Laison Al'Gaib when it was WWIV, then Random when it became Amber.

Bell continued to own and develop the WWIV software for over a decade, becoming an iconic figure in the online world, before the privatization and subsequent expansion of the Internet caused the BBS world to fade in the mid to late nineties.

Bell eventually sold WWIV, retaining his career as a computer technician.

Clips of an interview with Bell appear as part of BBS: The Documentary.
