= WWIV =

Brand of bulletin board system software

- Developer: Wayne Bell
- Release: 1984; 42 years ago
- Written in: BASIC, Pascal, C, C++
- Type: bulletin board system
- License: Apache v2
- Website: www.wwivbbs.org
- Repository: github.com/wwivbbs/wwiv

WWIV is a brand of bulletin board system software that reached peak popularity from the late 1980s through the mid-1990s. The modifiable source code allowed a sysop to customize the main BBS program for their particular needs and aesthetics. WWIV also allowed tens of thousands of BBSes to link together, forming a worldwide proprietary computer network, the WWIVnet, similar to FidoNet. Today, the software continues to be developed and still used to run modern BBS systems, as well as WWIVnet.

== History ==
=== Origins ===
WWIV started out in early 1984 as a single BBS in Los Angeles, California, run by Wayne Bell, who wrote the original 1.0 version in BASIC as a high school programing project, and shared the software with 25 of his friends.

As the popularity of WWIV spread in the mid-1980s, for practical reasons Bell switched to Pascal—specifically Borland's Turbo Pascal 2.0—creating a compiled version of the BBS but distributing the source code for it to anyone who was interested in their own BBS. This encouraged sysops to develop new features for WWIV, and these ideas were released as "mods" that others could add to their own copies.

Shortly after releasing the 2.0 version, Borland updated the compiler to the 3.0 and 3.1 versions; WWIV's versions were revised to reflect the compiler versions. One of Turbo Pascal's strong features was the ability to easily "chain" sub-programs and external modules into memory only as required; as the average available RAM for a program to load and run in MS-DOS was 384 kilobytes, this became a very important feature. "Chaining" allowed for online games and other utilities to be used with WWIV without having to add the new source code for the game and then recompiling the entire BBS again. These programs—referred to as "chains" or "doors"—became very popular.

=== The switch to C++ ===
After Borland released Turbo Pascal 4.0 in 1987 and changed the structure of how compiled programs behaved—which made "chained" sub-programs such as the popular game Trade Wars II and Geopolitik impossible to run—Bell switched to Turbo C, which allowed for remote shell operations and easy porting of the old games and utilities written for the Pascal versions. Until WWIV version 5.x, WWIV was written in C. For the open-source release, WWIV was converted to C++.

Bell also modified the base source so that multiple instances of the BBS could be running on the same system, with nonconflicting access to the various user databases. This was done to not only allow multiple-line BBSes to exist using WWIV, but to allow all WWIV sysops to access their own BBS without having to wait for a user to log off and/or be rude and kick them off. One other side-effect of the multi-line capability was that IBM's OS/2—specifically the Warp version—became a popular choice for some WWIV sysops, as the default two instance configuration could easily run under the most basic OS/2 system. In the BBS world, WWIV was referred to sometimes as the "only killer app for OS/2, and it wasn't even written for it!". WWIV did run well in Microsoft Windows—often better than Windows-native BBSes—because DOS applications run preemptively, even with Windows 3.1. WWIV also ran well under Quarterdesk's DESQview and DESQVIEW/X multitasking shells.

The switch to C also allowed for Bell to implement a rather flexible BBS network, WWIVnet, allowing all WWIV boards to link to each other. Bell also took the opportunity to try to make some small amount of money back for his efforts. Starting with the C version, those who paid a registration fee, as high as US$80 (equivalent to $170 in 2025) in 1994, received copies of the source code to modify and recompile. The ability to modify WWIV as a sysop saw fit was one of its selling points—something that RBBS, Opus, Genesis, and many of the other BBS programs of the era did not provide, usually on the basis of the perceived security risk. Nevertheless, source code availability was not lost on the thousands of WWIV sysops, who had begun to regard Bell as a cross between a father figure and a revolutionary. Registration also was required for membership in WWIVnet, which encouraged the growth of alternative WWIV-based networks.

This also generated a subculture of unregistered WWIV boards, which at its peak represented a multiple of the number of officially registered boards, and even passed around unlicensed copies of the source code, as well as forming their own networks.

=== The rise of WWIVnet ===
Registration also provided permission to link to the main network, WWIVnet, which soon connected thousands of boards together into a network spread across several nations. Boards in a WWIV network are identified within the network by a node number. Local e-mail within a board was sent by sending a message to a BBS user's user number (the sysop always being user 1). However, to e-mail a user at another board within a WWIV network, the @ sign would be added (similar to an internet e-mail address), followed by the node number. In the case of WWIVnet, node number 1 was a WWIV BBS named Amber, the BBS run by Wayne Bell in the South Bay region of Los Angeles County, California. The e-mail address 1@1 on the WWIVnet belonged to him. The Dragon's Den, another important node of the WWIVnet BBS network (@5252), was operated in Austin, Texas by Wig De Moville (a.k.a. "Filo"), who assumed the position of administering the sales of the WWIV source code.

Wayne Bell wrote and released the "Net30" program which allowed multiple WWIV bulletin board systems to connect to each other, forming a network called WWIVnet. WWIVlink was the next WWIV-based BBS network to be created that did not require the member BBS systems to be registered. As versions of WWIV became available that would support WWIV-networking "plugins," there were suddenly dozens of new WWIV networks such as IceNET (run by Jim Nunn in Buffalo, New York), FILEnet (run by Dennis M. Myers in Richmond, Virginia) and WWIVlink, TerraNET (run by Cris McRae), EliteLink, ChaosNET (centered on Jacksonville, Florida), and TriNet around Washington, D.C. It soon became very common for systems to be members of multiple networks. One drawback of being a part of multiple networks was that in order to transfer your mail packets for each network, separate calls were necessary. One system operator named Jayson Cowan developed a program called Linker that combined those packets into one that would be routed properly on the receiving system. The receiving system had to be configured to accept those network packets and agree to have their system process them. Linker played an integral part of increasing the popularity of systems being on more than one WWIV based network.

As the Internet began to rise in popularity and availability a new method of packaging WWIV messages for transport by internet email was developed. The test network (PPPnet) was a great success. It later was merged into FILEnet, which provided for the transfer of large files between systems. The merged FILEnet shortly became the backbone for WWIV-based network traffic over the Internet, eliminating costly long-distance calls as well as the need for Linker.

At their peaks, the large WWIV-based networks each had:

- WWIVnet, 1,700 systems
- IceNET, 850 systems
- WWIVlink, 675 systems
- TerraNET, 470 systems

=== Gateways to non-WWIV computer networks ===
As the WWIV software continued to be improved, and more third-party software was being developed for the BBS system, new gateways systems were set up. Most notably, WWIVnet–FidoNet gateways that allowed some interconnectivity between the two traditionally hostile networks. Similar WWIVnet gateways even allowed messages to be sent to and from standard Internet email addresses and USENET newsgroups by means of the UUCP protocol.

Thanks to the network implementation, WWIV sysops and their users worldwide became united to one another much in the same way forum communities exist on the Internet today. This camaraderie gave rise to WWIVCons, annual meetings where sysops and users of WWIV boards met in some central, real-life location to share stories, modifications and discuss the future of BBSing. It gave everyone a chance to see just what the person on the other side of the screen actually looked like in a day when GUIs and browsers with tons of pictures available at a click simply hadn't been invented yet.

=== WWIV vs Fido: controversies and BBS wars ===
Despite its popularity, WWIV wasn't without its share of controversy. To quite a few non-WWIV sysops, using WWIV was a sign of rebellion against the status quo; in fact, several key FidoNet administrators were quoted on several occasions that they firmly believed that running a WWIV board meant that you were probably running a "pirate" or "hacker" BBS, and that no WWIV BBS should be allowed access to FidoNet. This would lead to Bell's creation of WWIVnet in 1987, which at its peak, was the world's largest proprietary BBS network, and while the total number of systems never exceeded 1600, the sheer amount of traffic passed over the network was almost double that of FidoNet for almost a two-year period between 1991 and 1993.

=== Current status ===
Although BBSes have been eclipsed by the World Wide Web and the Internet, WWIV still has a community of developers. The 5.0 release has enhanced Internet gateway capabilities such as telnet accessibility, and other modern features. WWIV uses the Synchronet FOSSIL driver and is released under the Apache Software License.

WWIV is owned by Dean Nash aka Trader Jack.

== Influences and reception ==
Due to its popularity, WWIV influenced later BBS programs. VBBS, written by Roland DeGraaf in 1990 using QuickBASIC, contained a WWIV-type interface and networking that was compatible with WWIVnet. Early versions of VBBS listed features such as "WWIV Compatible" and "Can be run as a door from WWIV BBS." Telegard and Renegade BBS packages were heavily based on an older version of WWIV source code. WWIV was ported to the Apple Macintosh by Terry Teague and later a WWIV clone for the Macintosh named Hermes was written by Frank Price.
