= Travian =

Browser game

Travian: Legends
- Original author: Gerhard Müller
- Developer: Travian Games
- Release: 5 September 2004
- Stable release: 4.6 / 15 March 2021; 5 years ago
- Written in: PHP
- Platform: Web browser
- Available in: 41 languages
- Type: Real-time military strategy City-building
- Licence: Freemium
- Website: www.travian.com

Travian: Legends is a persistent, browser-based, massively multiplayer, online real-time strategy game developed by the German software company Travian Games. It was originally written and released in June 2004 as "Travian" by Gerhard Müller. Set in classical antiquity, Travian: Legends is a predominantly militaristic real-time strategy game.

Travian has been translated into over 40 languages from the original German version, and at one time boasted over 5 million players on over 300 game servers worldwide. In 2006, it won the Superbrowsergame Award, in the large games category.

Travian: Legends is programmed in PHP and runs in most modern browsers. Its creators may have drawn from an earlier German board game, The Settlers of Catan, for layout and the resource development theme.

== Gameplay ==
Travian: Legends is set in classical antiquity. Each player starts the game as the leader of a small, undeveloped village, surrounded by undeveloped resource fields. Developing these fields increases their resource output. The village can be developed by constructing new buildings and upgrading existing ones. Recruiting military units allows players to attack other villages to plunder resources, and defend from enemy attacks. Villages may trade their resources with other villages if both villages have a marketplace. The player may expand their realm by founding new villages, or by conquering other players' villages. Players can communicate with each other using in-game messages, and may join alliances for military and economic co-operation with other players.

=== Starting a game ===
Players must register on the Travian website to join a game, providing an e-mail address, and creating a username and a password.

The player must also choose a tribe to play the game with, and select a World, that represents a game server, to play in. Entities in one World can only interact with other entities in the same World. Events that take place in one World do not affect other Worlds. Players may operate accounts in multiple Worlds, but operating more than one account in the same World is prohibited by the rules. However, multiple players may operate a single account. Worlds close registrations for new players after a certain number of players have signed up.

After logging in, the player can follow a tutorial that guides them through various aspects of the game and offers rewards for successful completion. At the start of the game, there is a "beginner's protection" period, in which the player cannot be attacked, the length of which depends on the server.

=== Tribes ===
There are three playable tribes (the Romans, the Gauls, and the Teutons) and two non-playable tribes (Natars and Nature) on classic Travian: Legend servers. Travian: Fire and Sand introduced two more playable tribes (Huns and Egyptians) which are later incorporated into all international servers. Travian: Glory of Sparta introduced the Spartans, which has been incorporated into regular servers as well. A special 2025 spring game round, Travian: Northern Legends introduced the Vikings as a temporarily playable faction. Players select one of these tribes during registration.

Each tribe possesses unique capabilities. Romans can upgrade buildings and resource fields simultaneously, have powerful troops which are expensive to train, and have low-capacity merchants. Gauls have fast-moving troops with good defensive capabilities, and fast merchants. Teutons are geared towards an aggressive style of play, and offer weak but cheap troops, as well as slow but high-capacity merchants. Huns boasts effective, rapid offensive troops focused on cavalry and enhanced expanding abilities but suffer from lack of defense. Egyptians boost their economy and comes with strong, flexible defensive units suitable for newer players, but has no meaningful attacking-focused units. Spartans can train some of the strongest infantries in the game capable of both offense and defense, but are generally weak against cavalry. Once a tribe is chosen by the player, all villages founded or conquered by the player will be of that tribe for the duration of the game round. However, more recent special servers have offered the option of choosing another tribe for new villages.

The two NPC tribes are the Natars and Nature. Natarian villages randomly spawn all over the map, and will gradually develop. Villages of players who have deleted their accounts will also have a chance of turning into Natarian villages. These villages can be attacked and conquered by players. Natars also occupy the central area of the map, and will attack players' villages in that area. Natarian villages may hold ancient artefacts which give bonuses to those who possess them.

Nature is the tribe to which animals occupying abandoned oases on the map belong. Unlike the other four tribes, Natural troops cannot attack other villages but may be attacked. It is possible to capture animals from oases and use them as defensive units.

=== Resources ===
Map view resource travian

Developing villages and training units consumes resources. Resources are produced by the resource fields that surround each settlement; their output can be increased by upgrading the fields and by capturing nearby oases. There are four kinds of resources in Travian: wood, clay, iron and crop. Each resource is required to develop a village, with clay being the most demanded used resource for construction. Additionally, consumption of resources will vary based on the player's tribe: Roman troops require iron for their armour, Teutonic troops require wood, and Gallic troops require clay. Military units and the village population consume crop, so the net crop production is lowered whenever the population grows or a new military unit joins the village.

Troops can raid other villages to plunder resources. Resources can also be transferred to other villages unilaterally if the source village has a marketplace. Bilateral trade can take place when both villages have a marketplace, and one village accepts a trading deal offered by another.

=== Buildings ===
Buildings can be built and upgraded in the 22 building slots in the village centre. They cost time and resources to construct, and attract more people to settle in the village, increasing the population. Buildings may have a prerequisite that one or more of the other buildings must be at a certain level. Each type of building has a different use. New villages start with the main building, which decreases the construction time of new extensions to the buildings and resource fields in the village. Warehouses and granaries allow the village to store more resources. Military units are trained at the barracks, stable, workshop, residence and palace, while military research is conducted at the academy and the armoury. There are also buildings that enhance the resource production in the village. A treasure chamber allows the village to hold an artefact, and shows the list of the locations of all the artefacts in the game.

=== Villages ===
A developed village.

Each player starts the game with a single undeveloped village, designated as the capital. A village consists of the village centre, and 18 resource fields that surround the village centre. Up to 22 buildings can be constructed in the village centre. Of these, two are special-purpose building spaces, for the walls and the rally point. In an undeveloped village, the resource fields are at level 0, and there is only a single building, known as the main building.

Players can found or conquer additional villages to expand their realm, increase total resource production and help support larger armies. There are prerequisites for founding or conquering additional villages. The player must have accumulated enough culture points, which are passively produced by most buildings, and actively produced by hosting parties in the town hall. The number of culture points required depends on the total number of villages the player already controls. The player must also have a palace or the residence building in a village he or she controls to be at a particular level. The level requirement depends on the number of villages founded or conquered by troops from that particular village. Once these criteria are met, the player may train three settlers to go and found a new village at a chosen vacant area on the map. Settlers must be given 750 of each resource before they start their journey. When the settlers reach their destination, they will found an undeveloped village which will be under the player's control.

Instead of founding a new village, a player may choose to conquer another village. The player may train an administrator (a Roman senator, a Teutonic chief or a Gallic chieftain) instead of three settlers. Unlike settlers, these units must be researched in the academy before they can be trained. Administrators can be sent to another village, usually accompanied by other troops, where they will speak to the village's populace and reduce their loyalty to the defender. If the loyalty drops to zero, the village will join the attacker's realm. The defender will lose control of the village, and all troops originating from the village will cease to exist. A capital can not be conquered.

Villages are destroyed if its population drops to zero as a result of a siege. However, a village cannot be destroyed if it is a player's last village, so a player will always have at least one village.

=== Troops ===
Troops are military units that allow the player to attack and defend villages. They can carry resources, so they can be used to raid other villages. There are mainly three classifications of troop: tribe, mobility and function. There are fifty different types of troop in Travian, ten for each tribe. Troops are either infantry or cavalry. Most troop types are regular units, but each tribe has troop types to represent scouts, two types of siege engine, administrators and settlers. Each troop type has attributes which determine its training cost, upkeep, offensive capability, defensive capability against infantry and cavalry, speed and resource carrying capacity. Infantry is trained in the barracks, and cavalry is trained in the stable. Scouts are espionage units that can be used to spy on enemy villages, or defend from espionage attacks. Siege engines, which are built in the workshop, allow players to destroy enemy buildings and defensive structures. Administrators and settlers are units that have the ability to conquer or found new villages, respectively. They are trained in the residence or the palace.

At first, players may only recruit the most basic troop type of their tribe. To train more advanced troops, the player must research them in the academy in the village where they are to be trained. Troops may also require military buildings to be upgraded to a certain level before they may be researched.

Troops' offensive and defensive attributes may be improved by constructing an armoury to enhance their weapons and armour. Upgrading the barracks, stable and workshop allow faster training of troops. There are also buildings known as the great barracks and the great stable, which allow simultaneous training of the same troop type but at three times the cost. Roman villages can build a horse drinking trough to speed up training of cavalry and reduce their upkeep. Teutons can build a brewery which improves the offensive attributes of troops from that village.

There is also a special unit known as a hero, which can gain experience from battle. Heroes can equip items, embark on adventures, capture oases and produce resources. They can also accompany an army. Depending on their attributes, a hero may give an offensive or defensive bonus to the army that it accompanies.

=== Items ===
There are two types of items in the game; the first are artefacts, which gives bonuses to the holder, depending on the type of artefact; the second are equipment and consumables for the hero.

Artefacts are items which are introduced mid-game, and give significant bonuses to those who possess them. Upon release, they are placed in heavily defended Natarian villages, and can be acquired either by conquering the village, or by destroying the treasury in the target village and sending an army accompanied by the hero to capture the artefacts. All players with a treasury can see the locations of the artefacts. Based on the bonus strength and area of effect, artefacts are split into four categories: village-wide artefacts provide the bonus to the village that the artefacts are currently in; realm-level artefacts generally have a weaker bonus, but affect all the villages in the player's realm; unique artefacts also affect all the villages in the realm, but they provide bonuses that are at least as strong as that of village-wide artefacts; the fourth type of artefact provides alliance-wide effects, which are only used for the construction plans for the Wonders of the World that are released near the end of the game.

Different artefacts provide bonuses to different attributes. There are nine types of artefacts; the bonuses of the first six are stronger buildings, faster troops, better spies, less hungry troops, faster troop training, and improved cranny capacity with less precision for enemy catapults. The bonus and its strength provided by the seventh type are randomised, and switch between the first six every 24 hours. The effect can also be positive or negative. The eighth artefact provides the player with the construction plans for the great warehouse and granary. The ninth provides the plans for the Wonders of the World.

Equipment and consumable items affect the hero and the army that he or she accompanies. Equipment consists of armour and weapons for the hero, mounts, and special items that increase the speed or carrying capacity of the troops. Consumable items include those that regenerate the hero's health, provide experience points, reduce battle losses, increase culture points, reset the hero's attributes, and provide the means to capture animals from oases. Items are obtained during a hero's adventures, and can be traded on the silver market.

=== Alliances ===
Travian players can create and join alliances whose members support each other economically and militarily. Once in an alliance, the player can make, view and accept alliance-only resource trading offers in their village marketplaces. There are also features such as shared combat reports to support military cooperation between members. Each alliance member can view combat reports from every other member of the alliance, and there is a forum and a web chat feature for talking to other members. Alliance leaders can delegate powers to other members of the alliance, including the ability to send mass alliance-wide in-game messages, invite new players into the alliance, remove existing members of the alliance and change the alliance name and description.

The maximum number of members in an alliance is 60, so when an alliance wants to expand further, it splits into multiple wings. Members in one wing cannot view the combat reports of members in another wing, benefit from alliance-only resource trading, or use the web chat to talk to each other, since the game considers the wings to be separate alliances.

Travian also supports inter-alliance diplomacy. Two or more alliances may form a non-aggression pact or a military alliance pact. This is supported by features that prevent certain forms of aggression between members of the alliances in question. There is also a diplomatic feature to allow alliances to recognise a state of war. Towards the end of a game, different alliances often join together, resulting in large coalitions that fight each other to try to complete the victory conditions.

There is a ranking system which determines the rank of each alliance from attacking, defending, raiding and growth. Alliances earn medals for their profile page by ranking in the top 10 for a category. The medal will contain information about the category, the rank and when it was earned.

=== End game ===
Each round of Travian concludes with the end game sequence. For normal game rounds the sequence begins after about 200 days. After this time has elapsed, the plans for the construction of the Wonders of the World are released into Natarian villages. Coalitions of alliances work together to capture plans and construct a Wonder before rival coalitions. With every five levels that the Wonder is upgraded, the Natars attack the villages containing the Wonders until level 95, when they will then attack upon the completion of every new level. In addition to this, enemy coalitions also send attacks against the villages, sometimes timed to coincide with the Natarian attacks. The first player to build their World Wonder to level 100 is declared to be the winner of the round. The players with the most populous realm and the most successful attacking and defending streaks are also mentioned in the declaration.

After the winner is declared, the game stops and players can no longer build, trade or engage in combat. After a period of time, the next round begins, and the game starts afresh.

== Development ==
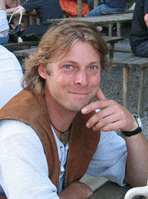
Oliver Eger, illustrator

Travian was developed and published in June 2004 as a PHP hobby project by Gerhard Müller, then a student of chemistry at the Technical University of Munich. The second version was released on 12 March 2005, with new buildings and changes to the game mechanics and graphics. Critical Gamers compared the game to The Settlers of Catan and Solar Realms Elite.

As a result of the unexpected success of the game, Gerhard Müller and his brother Siegfried Müller founded Travian Games as a non-trading partnership in July 2005, which was changed into a limited liability company later in the year. The operations and the rights of Travian were transferred to the company at the beginning of 2006.

In 2006, Travian Games began offering access to a mobile phone-optimised interface to the game through a subscription-based Java ME midlet. The application was developed by Markus Rieger of GameCreator. However, this application is no longer developed or supported.

Version 3 was released on 30 June 2006, and featured oases which could be annexed, and would supplement the player's hourly resource production, as opposed to the oases in version 2, which were only present for visual appeal. Version 3 also introduced 'heroes', military units which gain experience in battles. There were also major changes to game mechanics and graphics. Update 3.1 introduced quests that players could complete to receive rewards in the form of resource or game gold.

An edition of Travian where events take place three times faster, known as Travian Speed3x, was also released. Later Speed editions with different speed multipliers were released.

On March 16, 2007, an announcement was made about the release of Travian Classic, dubbed "Travian 2.5", which was based on version 3 but had certain features disabled in order to make it similar to version 2.

Update 3.5 was first implemented on the original .org server (German) in early February 2009, and was implemented on other servers with the game restarting in mid-2009. It reintroduced artifacts—items which give the players bonuses once captured. On 22 October 2009, it was followed by update 3.6, which made several Plus! account-only features available to non-paying users, along with newly added features.

In July 2010, an announcement was made saying that developers were working on a Version 4, which was released in February 2011.

== Financing ==
Travian was initially financed through players upgrading accounts with Travian Plus and web banners. Later, an option for purchasing 'Gold' replaced the one for buying 'Plus' on most servers. The introduction of 'Gold' allowed players to directly influence the game mechanics: for instance, by increasing resource production, instant completion of building and researches. At one point gold could purchase attack and defense bonuses of 10%, but this has been revoked in later servers. Accounts upgraded with Plus allowed building queues, larger maps and other functional abilities. These effects can be replicated with user scripts, but implementing these can result in a banning of the offending account as they are against the general terms and conditions of Travian. The Gold club, available since version 3.6, features attack lists and valley searches. Travian has also included a "Travian Shop" which includes Travian-related items like clothing and mugs.

== Reception ==
Travian was ranked at second place in the medium games category of Gamesdynamite's Superbrowsergame Award in 2005, and was chosen as the Most Innovative Browser Game of 2005 by Coole Browsergames.

In 2006, Travian won the Superbrowsergame Award, in the large games category, and was chosen as the Browser Game of the Year 2006 by Coole Browsergames.

Christian Donlan, game reviewer, described Travian's version 2 interface as "ugly", with a "primitive cartoon style" and a bad colour scheme. He characterised the game as "functional rather than beautiful", with an interface that is "uncluttered".

Travian was chosen as the Browser Game of the Year 2011 in the classic games category by GforGaming's jury.

=== Censorship ===
On 1 January 2013, Travian's Persian version was blocked in Iran, despite having a license from Ministry of Islamic Culture and Guidance, allegedly to support "the development of domestic online game companies," "to protect personal information," and "protect against the transfer of money out of the country." The block was lifted 10 days later, but the company shut down its Persian site completely.
